

304001–304100 

|-bgcolor=#fefefe
| 304001 ||  || — || January 31, 2006 || Kitt Peak || Spacewatch || — || align=right data-sort-value="0.67" | 670 m || 
|-id=002 bgcolor=#fefefe
| 304002 ||  || — || January 31, 2006 || Mount Lemmon || Mount Lemmon Survey || FLO || align=right | 1.6 km || 
|-id=003 bgcolor=#fefefe
| 304003 ||  || — || January 31, 2006 || Kitt Peak || Spacewatch || — || align=right data-sort-value="0.74" | 740 m || 
|-id=004 bgcolor=#fefefe
| 304004 ||  || — || January 28, 2006 || Anderson Mesa || LONEOS || — || align=right data-sort-value="0.94" | 940 m || 
|-id=005 bgcolor=#fefefe
| 304005 ||  || — || February 1, 2006 || Mount Lemmon || Mount Lemmon Survey || — || align=right data-sort-value="0.74" | 740 m || 
|-id=006 bgcolor=#fefefe
| 304006 ||  || — || February 1, 2006 || Kitt Peak || Spacewatch || — || align=right | 1.00 km || 
|-id=007 bgcolor=#fefefe
| 304007 ||  || — || February 1, 2006 || Mount Lemmon || Mount Lemmon Survey || — || align=right data-sort-value="0.98" | 980 m || 
|-id=008 bgcolor=#fefefe
| 304008 ||  || — || February 2, 2006 || Kitt Peak || Spacewatch || — || align=right data-sort-value="0.88" | 880 m || 
|-id=009 bgcolor=#fefefe
| 304009 ||  || — || February 2, 2006 || Kitt Peak || Spacewatch || FLO || align=right data-sort-value="0.74" | 740 m || 
|-id=010 bgcolor=#fefefe
| 304010 ||  || — || February 2, 2006 || Mount Lemmon || Mount Lemmon Survey || V || align=right data-sort-value="0.70" | 700 m || 
|-id=011 bgcolor=#fefefe
| 304011 ||  || — || February 3, 2006 || Anderson Mesa || LONEOS || — || align=right | 1.0 km || 
|-id=012 bgcolor=#fefefe
| 304012 ||  || — || February 20, 2006 || Kitt Peak || Spacewatch || — || align=right data-sort-value="0.75" | 750 m || 
|-id=013 bgcolor=#fefefe
| 304013 ||  || — || February 20, 2006 || Catalina || CSS || KLI || align=right | 2.7 km || 
|-id=014 bgcolor=#fefefe
| 304014 ||  || — || February 21, 2006 || Mount Lemmon || Mount Lemmon Survey || V || align=right data-sort-value="0.89" | 890 m || 
|-id=015 bgcolor=#fefefe
| 304015 ||  || — || February 20, 2006 || Catalina || CSS || — || align=right data-sort-value="0.93" | 930 m || 
|-id=016 bgcolor=#fefefe
| 304016 ||  || — || February 21, 2006 || Catalina || CSS || V || align=right | 1.0 km || 
|-id=017 bgcolor=#fefefe
| 304017 ||  || — || February 20, 2006 || Kitt Peak || Spacewatch || MAS || align=right | 1.00 km || 
|-id=018 bgcolor=#fefefe
| 304018 ||  || — || February 20, 2006 || Kitt Peak || Spacewatch || V || align=right data-sort-value="0.70" | 700 m || 
|-id=019 bgcolor=#fefefe
| 304019 ||  || — || February 20, 2006 || Kitt Peak || Spacewatch || — || align=right | 1.0 km || 
|-id=020 bgcolor=#fefefe
| 304020 ||  || — || February 20, 2006 || Mount Lemmon || Mount Lemmon Survey || — || align=right | 1.0 km || 
|-id=021 bgcolor=#fefefe
| 304021 ||  || — || February 23, 2006 || Kitt Peak || Spacewatch || NYS || align=right data-sort-value="0.98" | 980 m || 
|-id=022 bgcolor=#fefefe
| 304022 ||  || — || February 20, 2006 || Mount Lemmon || Mount Lemmon Survey || FLO || align=right data-sort-value="0.75" | 750 m || 
|-id=023 bgcolor=#fefefe
| 304023 ||  || — || February 20, 2006 || Mount Lemmon || Mount Lemmon Survey || V || align=right data-sort-value="0.89" | 890 m || 
|-id=024 bgcolor=#fefefe
| 304024 ||  || — || February 24, 2006 || Socorro || LINEAR || — || align=right | 1.2 km || 
|-id=025 bgcolor=#fefefe
| 304025 ||  || — || February 24, 2006 || Mount Lemmon || Mount Lemmon Survey || V || align=right data-sort-value="0.70" | 700 m || 
|-id=026 bgcolor=#fefefe
| 304026 ||  || — || February 22, 2006 || Catalina || CSS || — || align=right | 1.2 km || 
|-id=027 bgcolor=#fefefe
| 304027 ||  || — || February 20, 2006 || Kitt Peak || Spacewatch || NYS || align=right data-sort-value="0.78" | 780 m || 
|-id=028 bgcolor=#fefefe
| 304028 ||  || — || February 20, 2006 || Kitt Peak || Spacewatch || — || align=right | 1.2 km || 
|-id=029 bgcolor=#fefefe
| 304029 ||  || — || February 23, 2006 || Kitt Peak || Spacewatch || NYS || align=right data-sort-value="0.76" | 760 m || 
|-id=030 bgcolor=#fefefe
| 304030 ||  || — || February 23, 2006 || Kitt Peak || Spacewatch || — || align=right data-sort-value="0.93" | 930 m || 
|-id=031 bgcolor=#fefefe
| 304031 ||  || — || February 24, 2006 || Kitt Peak || Spacewatch || NYS || align=right data-sort-value="0.81" | 810 m || 
|-id=032 bgcolor=#fefefe
| 304032 ||  || — || February 24, 2006 || Mount Lemmon || Mount Lemmon Survey || — || align=right data-sort-value="0.80" | 800 m || 
|-id=033 bgcolor=#fefefe
| 304033 ||  || — || February 24, 2006 || Kitt Peak || Spacewatch || MAS || align=right data-sort-value="0.82" | 820 m || 
|-id=034 bgcolor=#fefefe
| 304034 ||  || — || February 24, 2006 || Kitt Peak || Spacewatch || V || align=right data-sort-value="0.85" | 850 m || 
|-id=035 bgcolor=#E9E9E9
| 304035 ||  || — || February 24, 2006 || Kitt Peak || Spacewatch || — || align=right | 1.4 km || 
|-id=036 bgcolor=#fefefe
| 304036 ||  || — || February 25, 2006 || Kitt Peak || Spacewatch || — || align=right data-sort-value="0.94" | 940 m || 
|-id=037 bgcolor=#fefefe
| 304037 ||  || — || February 25, 2006 || Kitt Peak || Spacewatch || — || align=right data-sort-value="0.97" | 970 m || 
|-id=038 bgcolor=#fefefe
| 304038 ||  || — || February 27, 2006 || Kitt Peak || Spacewatch || V || align=right data-sort-value="0.85" | 850 m || 
|-id=039 bgcolor=#fefefe
| 304039 ||  || — || February 20, 2006 || Catalina || CSS || — || align=right | 1.0 km || 
|-id=040 bgcolor=#fefefe
| 304040 ||  || — || February 25, 2006 || Kitt Peak || Spacewatch || — || align=right data-sort-value="0.81" | 810 m || 
|-id=041 bgcolor=#fefefe
| 304041 ||  || — || February 25, 2006 || Kitt Peak || Spacewatch || — || align=right data-sort-value="0.70" | 700 m || 
|-id=042 bgcolor=#fefefe
| 304042 ||  || — || February 25, 2006 || Kitt Peak || Spacewatch || ERI || align=right | 1.5 km || 
|-id=043 bgcolor=#fefefe
| 304043 ||  || — || February 25, 2006 || Kitt Peak || Spacewatch || — || align=right | 1.2 km || 
|-id=044 bgcolor=#fefefe
| 304044 ||  || — || February 25, 2006 || Kitt Peak || Spacewatch || NYS || align=right data-sort-value="0.58" | 580 m || 
|-id=045 bgcolor=#fefefe
| 304045 ||  || — || February 27, 2006 || Kitt Peak || Spacewatch || — || align=right data-sort-value="0.92" | 920 m || 
|-id=046 bgcolor=#fefefe
| 304046 ||  || — || February 27, 2006 || Kitt Peak || Spacewatch || — || align=right data-sort-value="0.85" | 850 m || 
|-id=047 bgcolor=#fefefe
| 304047 ||  || — || February 28, 2006 || Mount Lemmon || Mount Lemmon Survey || NYS || align=right data-sort-value="0.83" | 830 m || 
|-id=048 bgcolor=#fefefe
| 304048 ||  || — || February 20, 2006 || Kitt Peak || Spacewatch || — || align=right data-sort-value="0.77" | 770 m || 
|-id=049 bgcolor=#fefefe
| 304049 ||  || — || March 2, 2006 || Kitt Peak || Spacewatch || FLO || align=right data-sort-value="0.67" | 670 m || 
|-id=050 bgcolor=#fefefe
| 304050 ||  || — || March 2, 2006 || Kitt Peak || Spacewatch || — || align=right data-sort-value="0.83" | 830 m || 
|-id=051 bgcolor=#fefefe
| 304051 ||  || — || March 3, 2006 || Catalina || CSS || — || align=right data-sort-value="0.86" | 860 m || 
|-id=052 bgcolor=#fefefe
| 304052 ||  || — || March 3, 2006 || Catalina || CSS || — || align=right data-sort-value="0.99" | 990 m || 
|-id=053 bgcolor=#fefefe
| 304053 ||  || — || March 3, 2006 || Catalina || CSS || V || align=right | 1.2 km || 
|-id=054 bgcolor=#fefefe
| 304054 ||  || — || March 4, 2006 || Mount Lemmon || Mount Lemmon Survey || FLO || align=right data-sort-value="0.55" | 550 m || 
|-id=055 bgcolor=#fefefe
| 304055 ||  || — || March 4, 2006 || Kitt Peak || Spacewatch || — || align=right | 1.7 km || 
|-id=056 bgcolor=#fefefe
| 304056 ||  || — || March 5, 2006 || Kitt Peak || Spacewatch || NYS || align=right data-sort-value="0.83" | 830 m || 
|-id=057 bgcolor=#fefefe
| 304057 ||  || — || March 5, 2006 || Kitt Peak || Spacewatch || — || align=right | 1.2 km || 
|-id=058 bgcolor=#fefefe
| 304058 ||  || — || March 23, 2006 || Kitt Peak || Spacewatch || NYS || align=right data-sort-value="0.84" | 840 m || 
|-id=059 bgcolor=#fefefe
| 304059 ||  || — || March 23, 2006 || Kitt Peak || Spacewatch || — || align=right data-sort-value="0.98" | 980 m || 
|-id=060 bgcolor=#fefefe
| 304060 ||  || — || March 23, 2006 || Kitt Peak || Spacewatch || MAS || align=right data-sort-value="0.88" | 880 m || 
|-id=061 bgcolor=#fefefe
| 304061 ||  || — || March 23, 2006 || Kitt Peak || Spacewatch || — || align=right | 1.2 km || 
|-id=062 bgcolor=#fefefe
| 304062 ||  || — || March 23, 2006 || Mount Lemmon || Mount Lemmon Survey || NYS || align=right data-sort-value="0.63" | 630 m || 
|-id=063 bgcolor=#fefefe
| 304063 ||  || — || March 23, 2006 || Mount Lemmon || Mount Lemmon Survey || FLO || align=right data-sort-value="0.81" | 810 m || 
|-id=064 bgcolor=#fefefe
| 304064 ||  || — || March 24, 2006 || Mount Lemmon || Mount Lemmon Survey || ERI || align=right | 2.1 km || 
|-id=065 bgcolor=#fefefe
| 304065 ||  || — || March 24, 2006 || Kitt Peak || Spacewatch || NYS || align=right data-sort-value="0.69" | 690 m || 
|-id=066 bgcolor=#fefefe
| 304066 ||  || — || March 24, 2006 || Kitt Peak || Spacewatch || — || align=right data-sort-value="0.92" | 920 m || 
|-id=067 bgcolor=#fefefe
| 304067 ||  || — || March 25, 2006 || Palomar || NEAT || FLO || align=right data-sort-value="0.89" | 890 m || 
|-id=068 bgcolor=#E9E9E9
| 304068 ||  || — || March 23, 2006 || Kitt Peak || Spacewatch || — || align=right | 1.4 km || 
|-id=069 bgcolor=#fefefe
| 304069 ||  || — || March 24, 2006 || Socorro || LINEAR || — || align=right data-sort-value="0.89" | 890 m || 
|-id=070 bgcolor=#fefefe
| 304070 ||  || — || March 25, 2006 || Catalina || CSS || PHO || align=right | 3.1 km || 
|-id=071 bgcolor=#fefefe
| 304071 ||  || — || March 25, 2006 || Kitt Peak || Spacewatch || NYS || align=right data-sort-value="0.90" | 900 m || 
|-id=072 bgcolor=#fefefe
| 304072 ||  || — || April 2, 2006 || Kitt Peak || Spacewatch || — || align=right data-sort-value="0.70" | 700 m || 
|-id=073 bgcolor=#fefefe
| 304073 ||  || — || April 2, 2006 || Mount Lemmon || Mount Lemmon Survey || — || align=right data-sort-value="0.92" | 920 m || 
|-id=074 bgcolor=#E9E9E9
| 304074 ||  || — || April 2, 2006 || Kitt Peak || Spacewatch || — || align=right data-sort-value="0.86" | 860 m || 
|-id=075 bgcolor=#fefefe
| 304075 ||  || — || April 2, 2006 || Kitt Peak || Spacewatch || — || align=right data-sort-value="0.79" | 790 m || 
|-id=076 bgcolor=#fefefe
| 304076 ||  || — || April 2, 2006 || Mount Lemmon || Mount Lemmon Survey || — || align=right data-sort-value="0.84" | 840 m || 
|-id=077 bgcolor=#fefefe
| 304077 ||  || — || April 2, 2006 || Kitt Peak || Spacewatch || V || align=right data-sort-value="0.76" | 760 m || 
|-id=078 bgcolor=#fefefe
| 304078 ||  || — || April 7, 2006 || Catalina || CSS || V || align=right | 1.1 km || 
|-id=079 bgcolor=#fefefe
| 304079 ||  || — || April 9, 2006 || Kitt Peak || Spacewatch || — || align=right | 1.1 km || 
|-id=080 bgcolor=#fefefe
| 304080 ||  || — || April 4, 2006 || Črni Vrh || Črni Vrh || — || align=right | 1.3 km || 
|-id=081 bgcolor=#fefefe
| 304081 ||  || — || April 6, 2006 || Catalina || CSS || — || align=right | 1.1 km || 
|-id=082 bgcolor=#fefefe
| 304082 ||  || — || April 6, 2006 || Catalina || CSS || — || align=right | 1.3 km || 
|-id=083 bgcolor=#fefefe
| 304083 ||  || — || April 9, 2006 || Kitt Peak || Spacewatch || NYS || align=right data-sort-value="0.76" | 760 m || 
|-id=084 bgcolor=#fefefe
| 304084 ||  || — || April 2, 2006 || Mount Lemmon || Mount Lemmon Survey || V || align=right data-sort-value="0.76" | 760 m || 
|-id=085 bgcolor=#fefefe
| 304085 ||  || — || April 7, 2006 || Kitt Peak || Spacewatch || MAS || align=right data-sort-value="0.93" | 930 m || 
|-id=086 bgcolor=#fefefe
| 304086 ||  || — || April 18, 2006 || Palomar || NEAT || V || align=right data-sort-value="0.95" | 950 m || 
|-id=087 bgcolor=#fefefe
| 304087 ||  || — || April 18, 2006 || Anderson Mesa || LONEOS || — || align=right data-sort-value="0.88" | 880 m || 
|-id=088 bgcolor=#FFC2E0
| 304088 ||  || — || April 20, 2006 || Kitt Peak || Spacewatch || AMOcritical || align=right data-sort-value="0.51" | 510 m || 
|-id=089 bgcolor=#fefefe
| 304089 ||  || — || April 21, 2006 || Mount Lemmon || Mount Lemmon Survey || — || align=right | 1.1 km || 
|-id=090 bgcolor=#E9E9E9
| 304090 ||  || — || April 18, 2006 || Kitt Peak || Spacewatch || — || align=right | 1.2 km || 
|-id=091 bgcolor=#fefefe
| 304091 ||  || — || April 19, 2006 || Mount Lemmon || Mount Lemmon Survey || — || align=right data-sort-value="0.86" | 860 m || 
|-id=092 bgcolor=#E9E9E9
| 304092 ||  || — || April 20, 2006 || Kitt Peak || Spacewatch || — || align=right | 1.8 km || 
|-id=093 bgcolor=#FA8072
| 304093 ||  || — || April 23, 2006 || Catalina || CSS || — || align=right | 2.5 km || 
|-id=094 bgcolor=#fefefe
| 304094 ||  || — || April 19, 2006 || Anderson Mesa || LONEOS || — || align=right | 1.3 km || 
|-id=095 bgcolor=#E9E9E9
| 304095 ||  || — || April 20, 2006 || Mount Lemmon || Mount Lemmon Survey || — || align=right | 1.2 km || 
|-id=096 bgcolor=#E9E9E9
| 304096 ||  || — || April 26, 2006 || Catalina || CSS || — || align=right | 1.7 km || 
|-id=097 bgcolor=#fefefe
| 304097 ||  || — || April 26, 2006 || Mount Lemmon || Mount Lemmon Survey || NYS || align=right data-sort-value="0.72" | 720 m || 
|-id=098 bgcolor=#fefefe
| 304098 ||  || — || April 26, 2006 || Reedy Creek || J. Broughton || CHL || align=right | 3.1 km || 
|-id=099 bgcolor=#fefefe
| 304099 ||  || — || April 24, 2006 || Socorro || LINEAR || NYS || align=right data-sort-value="0.91" | 910 m || 
|-id=100 bgcolor=#fefefe
| 304100 ||  || — || April 30, 2006 || Kitt Peak || Spacewatch || — || align=right | 2.4 km || 
|}

304101–304200 

|-bgcolor=#fefefe
| 304101 ||  || — || April 24, 2006 || Socorro || LINEAR || — || align=right | 1.2 km || 
|-id=102 bgcolor=#fefefe
| 304102 ||  || — || April 24, 2006 || Kitt Peak || Spacewatch || — || align=right | 1.0 km || 
|-id=103 bgcolor=#fefefe
| 304103 ||  || — || April 25, 2006 || Kitt Peak || Spacewatch || — || align=right | 1.0 km || 
|-id=104 bgcolor=#fefefe
| 304104 ||  || — || April 25, 2006 || Kitt Peak || Spacewatch || FLO || align=right data-sort-value="0.91" | 910 m || 
|-id=105 bgcolor=#fefefe
| 304105 ||  || — || April 26, 2006 || Kitt Peak || Spacewatch || V || align=right data-sort-value="0.89" | 890 m || 
|-id=106 bgcolor=#fefefe
| 304106 ||  || — || April 29, 2006 || Kitt Peak || Spacewatch || V || align=right data-sort-value="0.97" | 970 m || 
|-id=107 bgcolor=#E9E9E9
| 304107 ||  || — || April 29, 2006 || Kitt Peak || Spacewatch || — || align=right | 2.1 km || 
|-id=108 bgcolor=#fefefe
| 304108 ||  || — || April 30, 2006 || Kitt Peak || Spacewatch || — || align=right data-sort-value="0.94" | 940 m || 
|-id=109 bgcolor=#fefefe
| 304109 ||  || — || April 30, 2006 || Kitt Peak || Spacewatch || — || align=right data-sort-value="0.87" | 870 m || 
|-id=110 bgcolor=#fefefe
| 304110 ||  || — || April 30, 2006 || Catalina || CSS || V || align=right data-sort-value="0.99" | 990 m || 
|-id=111 bgcolor=#fefefe
| 304111 ||  || — || April 30, 2006 || Kitt Peak || Spacewatch || V || align=right data-sort-value="0.63" | 630 m || 
|-id=112 bgcolor=#fefefe
| 304112 ||  || — || April 30, 2006 || Kitt Peak || Spacewatch || — || align=right data-sort-value="0.87" | 870 m || 
|-id=113 bgcolor=#fefefe
| 304113 ||  || — || May 3, 2006 || Mount Lemmon || Mount Lemmon Survey || V || align=right data-sort-value="0.97" | 970 m || 
|-id=114 bgcolor=#E9E9E9
| 304114 ||  || — || May 2, 2006 || Kitt Peak || Spacewatch || MAR || align=right | 1.1 km || 
|-id=115 bgcolor=#fefefe
| 304115 ||  || — || May 3, 2006 || Mount Lemmon || Mount Lemmon Survey || — || align=right | 1.2 km || 
|-id=116 bgcolor=#fefefe
| 304116 ||  || — || May 4, 2006 || Mount Lemmon || Mount Lemmon Survey || — || align=right data-sort-value="0.85" | 850 m || 
|-id=117 bgcolor=#E9E9E9
| 304117 ||  || — || May 3, 2006 || Kitt Peak || Spacewatch || — || align=right | 1.1 km || 
|-id=118 bgcolor=#fefefe
| 304118 ||  || — || May 5, 2006 || Kitt Peak || Spacewatch || FLO || align=right data-sort-value="0.81" | 810 m || 
|-id=119 bgcolor=#E9E9E9
| 304119 ||  || — || May 6, 2006 || Kitt Peak || Spacewatch || — || align=right | 3.0 km || 
|-id=120 bgcolor=#E9E9E9
| 304120 ||  || — || May 7, 2006 || Mount Lemmon || Mount Lemmon Survey || EUN || align=right | 1.1 km || 
|-id=121 bgcolor=#E9E9E9
| 304121 ||  || — || May 9, 2006 || Mount Lemmon || Mount Lemmon Survey || — || align=right | 3.5 km || 
|-id=122 bgcolor=#fefefe
| 304122 Ameliawehlau ||  ||  || May 1, 2006 || Mauna Kea || P. A. Wiegert || MAS || align=right data-sort-value="0.72" | 720 m || 
|-id=123 bgcolor=#E9E9E9
| 304123 ||  || — || May 18, 2006 || Palomar || NEAT || — || align=right | 1.1 km || 
|-id=124 bgcolor=#fefefe
| 304124 ||  || — || May 19, 2006 || Mount Lemmon || Mount Lemmon Survey || — || align=right | 1.1 km || 
|-id=125 bgcolor=#fefefe
| 304125 ||  || — || May 19, 2006 || Mount Lemmon || Mount Lemmon Survey || V || align=right data-sort-value="0.81" | 810 m || 
|-id=126 bgcolor=#E9E9E9
| 304126 ||  || — || May 20, 2006 || Kitt Peak || Spacewatch || — || align=right | 2.1 km || 
|-id=127 bgcolor=#E9E9E9
| 304127 ||  || — || May 20, 2006 || Palomar || NEAT || JUL || align=right | 1.5 km || 
|-id=128 bgcolor=#E9E9E9
| 304128 ||  || — || May 20, 2006 || Catalina || CSS || — || align=right | 1.8 km || 
|-id=129 bgcolor=#fefefe
| 304129 ||  || — || May 21, 2006 || Mount Lemmon || Mount Lemmon Survey || — || align=right data-sort-value="0.90" | 900 m || 
|-id=130 bgcolor=#E9E9E9
| 304130 ||  || — || May 18, 2006 || Palomar || NEAT || JUN || align=right | 1.5 km || 
|-id=131 bgcolor=#fefefe
| 304131 ||  || — || May 20, 2006 || Mount Lemmon || Mount Lemmon Survey || — || align=right data-sort-value="0.90" | 900 m || 
|-id=132 bgcolor=#E9E9E9
| 304132 ||  || — || May 21, 2006 || Mount Lemmon || Mount Lemmon Survey || — || align=right data-sort-value="0.98" | 980 m || 
|-id=133 bgcolor=#E9E9E9
| 304133 ||  || — || May 21, 2006 || Mount Lemmon || Mount Lemmon Survey || — || align=right | 1.6 km || 
|-id=134 bgcolor=#fefefe
| 304134 ||  || — || May 23, 2006 || Kitt Peak || Spacewatch || — || align=right data-sort-value="0.80" | 800 m || 
|-id=135 bgcolor=#E9E9E9
| 304135 ||  || — || May 23, 2006 || Kitt Peak || Spacewatch || — || align=right | 1.1 km || 
|-id=136 bgcolor=#E9E9E9
| 304136 ||  || — || May 23, 2006 || Mount Lemmon || Mount Lemmon Survey || — || align=right | 2.2 km || 
|-id=137 bgcolor=#fefefe
| 304137 ||  || — || May 22, 2006 || Kitt Peak || Spacewatch || — || align=right data-sort-value="0.97" | 970 m || 
|-id=138 bgcolor=#E9E9E9
| 304138 ||  || — || May 24, 2006 || Palomar || NEAT || — || align=right | 1.8 km || 
|-id=139 bgcolor=#E9E9E9
| 304139 ||  || — || May 24, 2006 || Palomar || NEAT || MIT || align=right | 2.5 km || 
|-id=140 bgcolor=#E9E9E9
| 304140 ||  || — || May 25, 2006 || Mount Lemmon || Mount Lemmon Survey || ADE || align=right | 2.9 km || 
|-id=141 bgcolor=#E9E9E9
| 304141 ||  || — || May 25, 2006 || Mount Lemmon || Mount Lemmon Survey || — || align=right data-sort-value="0.98" | 980 m || 
|-id=142 bgcolor=#E9E9E9
| 304142 ||  || — || May 25, 2006 || Mount Lemmon || Mount Lemmon Survey || — || align=right | 1.6 km || 
|-id=143 bgcolor=#E9E9E9
| 304143 ||  || — || May 22, 2006 || Kitt Peak || Spacewatch || — || align=right | 1.5 km || 
|-id=144 bgcolor=#E9E9E9
| 304144 ||  || — || May 25, 2006 || Kitt Peak || Spacewatch || — || align=right | 1.1 km || 
|-id=145 bgcolor=#E9E9E9
| 304145 ||  || — || May 26, 2006 || Mount Lemmon || Mount Lemmon Survey || — || align=right | 1.1 km || 
|-id=146 bgcolor=#E9E9E9
| 304146 ||  || — || May 27, 2006 || Kitt Peak || Spacewatch || — || align=right | 2.6 km || 
|-id=147 bgcolor=#fefefe
| 304147 ||  || — || May 29, 2006 || Kitt Peak || Spacewatch || — || align=right data-sort-value="0.77" | 770 m || 
|-id=148 bgcolor=#E9E9E9
| 304148 ||  || — || May 26, 2006 || Siding Spring || SSS || — || align=right | 2.7 km || 
|-id=149 bgcolor=#E9E9E9
| 304149 ||  || — || May 29, 2006 || Siding Spring || SSS || — || align=right | 4.0 km || 
|-id=150 bgcolor=#E9E9E9
| 304150 ||  || — || June 15, 2006 || Kitt Peak || Spacewatch || EUN || align=right | 1.2 km || 
|-id=151 bgcolor=#E9E9E9
| 304151 ||  || — || June 17, 2006 || Siding Spring || SSS || — || align=right | 1.8 km || 
|-id=152 bgcolor=#E9E9E9
| 304152 || 2006 NH || — || July 3, 2006 || Hibiscus || S. F. Hönig || — || align=right | 2.1 km || 
|-id=153 bgcolor=#FFC2E0
| 304153 ||  || — || July 25, 2006 || Mount Lemmon || Mount Lemmon Survey || AMO +1km || align=right | 2.1 km || 
|-id=154 bgcolor=#E9E9E9
| 304154 ||  || — || July 18, 2006 || Siding Spring || SSS || JUN || align=right | 1.3 km || 
|-id=155 bgcolor=#E9E9E9
| 304155 ||  || — || July 20, 2006 || Siding Spring || SSS || GER || align=right | 4.0 km || 
|-id=156 bgcolor=#E9E9E9
| 304156 ||  || — || July 20, 2006 || Siding Spring || SSS || — || align=right | 3.8 km || 
|-id=157 bgcolor=#E9E9E9
| 304157 ||  || — || July 21, 2006 || Mount Lemmon || Mount Lemmon Survey || — || align=right | 2.4 km || 
|-id=158 bgcolor=#E9E9E9
| 304158 ||  || — || July 18, 2006 || Siding Spring || SSS || CLO || align=right | 3.2 km || 
|-id=159 bgcolor=#E9E9E9
| 304159 || 2006 PF || — || August 2, 2006 || Pla D'Arguines || R. Ferrando || — || align=right | 3.1 km || 
|-id=160 bgcolor=#FA8072
| 304160 ||  || — || August 13, 2006 || Palomar || NEAT || H || align=right data-sort-value="0.87" | 870 m || 
|-id=161 bgcolor=#E9E9E9
| 304161 ||  || — || August 12, 2006 || Palomar || NEAT || — || align=right | 3.0 km || 
|-id=162 bgcolor=#E9E9E9
| 304162 ||  || — || August 12, 2006 || Palomar || NEAT || — || align=right | 2.0 km || 
|-id=163 bgcolor=#E9E9E9
| 304163 ||  || — || August 12, 2006 || Palomar || NEAT || — || align=right | 2.0 km || 
|-id=164 bgcolor=#E9E9E9
| 304164 ||  || — || August 13, 2006 || Palomar || NEAT || WIT || align=right | 1.3 km || 
|-id=165 bgcolor=#E9E9E9
| 304165 ||  || — || August 13, 2006 || Palomar || NEAT || — || align=right | 2.7 km || 
|-id=166 bgcolor=#E9E9E9
| 304166 ||  || — || August 15, 2006 || Palomar || NEAT || AGN || align=right | 1.4 km || 
|-id=167 bgcolor=#E9E9E9
| 304167 ||  || — || August 15, 2006 || Palomar || NEAT || — || align=right | 3.4 km || 
|-id=168 bgcolor=#E9E9E9
| 304168 ||  || — || August 14, 2006 || Siding Spring || SSS || TIN || align=right | 2.0 km || 
|-id=169 bgcolor=#E9E9E9
| 304169 ||  || — || August 13, 2006 || Palomar || NEAT || — || align=right | 2.6 km || 
|-id=170 bgcolor=#E9E9E9
| 304170 ||  || — || August 13, 2006 || Palomar || NEAT || — || align=right | 1.3 km || 
|-id=171 bgcolor=#E9E9E9
| 304171 ||  || — || August 14, 2006 || Palomar || NEAT || — || align=right | 2.8 km || 
|-id=172 bgcolor=#E9E9E9
| 304172 ||  || — || August 14, 2006 || Palomar || NEAT || — || align=right | 3.1 km || 
|-id=173 bgcolor=#E9E9E9
| 304173 ||  || — || August 15, 2006 || Lulin Observatory || C.-S. Lin, Q.-z. Ye || GEF || align=right | 1.5 km || 
|-id=174 bgcolor=#E9E9E9
| 304174 ||  || — || August 6, 2006 || Lulin || C.-S. Lin, Q.-z. Ye || — || align=right | 2.3 km || 
|-id=175 bgcolor=#E9E9E9
| 304175 ||  || — || August 18, 2006 || Kitt Peak || Spacewatch || — || align=right | 2.1 km || 
|-id=176 bgcolor=#E9E9E9
| 304176 ||  || — || August 16, 2006 || Reedy Creek || J. Broughton || — || align=right | 3.1 km || 
|-id=177 bgcolor=#E9E9E9
| 304177 ||  || — || August 19, 2006 || Kitt Peak || Spacewatch || — || align=right | 3.0 km || 
|-id=178 bgcolor=#E9E9E9
| 304178 ||  || — || August 17, 2006 || Palomar || NEAT || RAF || align=right | 1.1 km || 
|-id=179 bgcolor=#E9E9E9
| 304179 ||  || — || August 17, 2006 || Palomar || NEAT || — || align=right | 2.2 km || 
|-id=180 bgcolor=#E9E9E9
| 304180 ||  || — || August 19, 2006 || Anderson Mesa || LONEOS || MAR || align=right | 1.7 km || 
|-id=181 bgcolor=#E9E9E9
| 304181 ||  || — || August 19, 2006 || Kitt Peak || Spacewatch || MRX || align=right | 1.2 km || 
|-id=182 bgcolor=#E9E9E9
| 304182 ||  || — || August 16, 2006 || Siding Spring || SSS || — || align=right | 2.0 km || 
|-id=183 bgcolor=#E9E9E9
| 304183 ||  || — || August 17, 2006 || Palomar || NEAT || — || align=right | 2.7 km || 
|-id=184 bgcolor=#E9E9E9
| 304184 ||  || — || August 23, 2006 || Palomar || NEAT || — || align=right | 2.8 km || 
|-id=185 bgcolor=#E9E9E9
| 304185 ||  || — || August 23, 2006 || Palomar || NEAT || — || align=right | 2.1 km || 
|-id=186 bgcolor=#E9E9E9
| 304186 ||  || — || August 20, 2006 || Kitt Peak || Spacewatch || — || align=right | 2.5 km || 
|-id=187 bgcolor=#E9E9E9
| 304187 ||  || — || August 23, 2006 || Črni Vrh || Črni Vrh || — || align=right | 3.7 km || 
|-id=188 bgcolor=#E9E9E9
| 304188 ||  || — || August 19, 2006 || Palomar || NEAT || — || align=right | 3.6 km || 
|-id=189 bgcolor=#E9E9E9
| 304189 ||  || — || August 27, 2006 || Kitt Peak || Spacewatch || — || align=right | 2.2 km || 
|-id=190 bgcolor=#E9E9E9
| 304190 ||  || — || August 25, 2006 || Hibiscus || S. F. Hönig || — || align=right | 2.5 km || 
|-id=191 bgcolor=#E9E9E9
| 304191 ||  || — || August 21, 2006 || Kitt Peak || Spacewatch || — || align=right | 2.2 km || 
|-id=192 bgcolor=#E9E9E9
| 304192 ||  || — || August 23, 2006 || Socorro || LINEAR || INO || align=right | 1.8 km || 
|-id=193 bgcolor=#E9E9E9
| 304193 ||  || — || August 24, 2006 || Socorro || LINEAR || — || align=right | 3.0 km || 
|-id=194 bgcolor=#E9E9E9
| 304194 ||  || — || August 24, 2006 || Palomar || NEAT || — || align=right | 2.3 km || 
|-id=195 bgcolor=#E9E9E9
| 304195 ||  || — || August 25, 2006 || Pises || Pises Obs. || — || align=right | 1.8 km || 
|-id=196 bgcolor=#E9E9E9
| 304196 ||  || — || April 9, 2005 || Kitt Peak || Spacewatch || — || align=right | 1.7 km || 
|-id=197 bgcolor=#E9E9E9
| 304197 ||  || — || August 16, 2006 || Palomar || NEAT || — || align=right | 3.7 km || 
|-id=198 bgcolor=#E9E9E9
| 304198 ||  || — || August 22, 2006 || Palomar || NEAT || — || align=right | 2.2 km || 
|-id=199 bgcolor=#E9E9E9
| 304199 ||  || — || August 24, 2006 || Socorro || LINEAR || — || align=right | 3.9 km || 
|-id=200 bgcolor=#E9E9E9
| 304200 ||  || — || August 27, 2006 || Kitt Peak || Spacewatch || — || align=right | 2.4 km || 
|}

304201–304300 

|-bgcolor=#E9E9E9
| 304201 ||  || — || August 28, 2006 || Catalina || CSS || — || align=right | 1.6 km || 
|-id=202 bgcolor=#E9E9E9
| 304202 ||  || — || August 28, 2006 || Catalina || CSS || — || align=right | 2.7 km || 
|-id=203 bgcolor=#E9E9E9
| 304203 ||  || — || August 27, 2006 || Vallemare di Borbona || V. S. Casulli || — || align=right | 2.3 km || 
|-id=204 bgcolor=#E9E9E9
| 304204 ||  || — || August 23, 2006 || Palomar || NEAT || — || align=right | 2.4 km || 
|-id=205 bgcolor=#E9E9E9
| 304205 ||  || — || August 27, 2006 || Anderson Mesa || LONEOS || DOR || align=right | 3.4 km || 
|-id=206 bgcolor=#E9E9E9
| 304206 ||  || — || August 27, 2006 || Anderson Mesa || LONEOS || HNA || align=right | 2.9 km || 
|-id=207 bgcolor=#E9E9E9
| 304207 ||  || — || August 27, 2006 || Anderson Mesa || LONEOS || — || align=right | 2.6 km || 
|-id=208 bgcolor=#E9E9E9
| 304208 ||  || — || August 27, 2006 || Anderson Mesa || LONEOS || — || align=right | 2.5 km || 
|-id=209 bgcolor=#E9E9E9
| 304209 ||  || — || August 29, 2006 || Catalina || CSS || — || align=right | 2.8 km || 
|-id=210 bgcolor=#E9E9E9
| 304210 ||  || — || August 29, 2006 || Catalina || CSS || DOR || align=right | 2.3 km || 
|-id=211 bgcolor=#E9E9E9
| 304211 ||  || — || August 29, 2006 || Anderson Mesa || LONEOS || — || align=right | 3.2 km || 
|-id=212 bgcolor=#E9E9E9
| 304212 ||  || — || August 17, 2006 || Palomar || NEAT || — || align=right | 2.1 km || 
|-id=213 bgcolor=#E9E9E9
| 304213 ||  || — || August 19, 2006 || Palomar || NEAT || — || align=right | 2.5 km || 
|-id=214 bgcolor=#E9E9E9
| 304214 ||  || — || August 24, 2006 || Socorro || LINEAR || DOR || align=right | 3.3 km || 
|-id=215 bgcolor=#E9E9E9
| 304215 ||  || — || August 30, 2006 || Anderson Mesa || LONEOS || — || align=right | 3.6 km || 
|-id=216 bgcolor=#E9E9E9
| 304216 ||  || — || August 16, 2006 || Lulin || C.-S. Lin, Q.-z. Ye || MRX || align=right | 1.1 km || 
|-id=217 bgcolor=#E9E9E9
| 304217 ||  || — || August 18, 2006 || Palomar || NEAT || — || align=right | 2.0 km || 
|-id=218 bgcolor=#E9E9E9
| 304218 ||  || — || August 18, 2006 || Kitt Peak || Spacewatch || MRX || align=right | 1.2 km || 
|-id=219 bgcolor=#E9E9E9
| 304219 ||  || — || August 18, 2006 || Kitt Peak || Spacewatch || INO || align=right | 1.2 km || 
|-id=220 bgcolor=#E9E9E9
| 304220 ||  || — || August 19, 2006 || Kitt Peak || Spacewatch || WIT || align=right | 1.1 km || 
|-id=221 bgcolor=#E9E9E9
| 304221 ||  || — || August 19, 2006 || Kitt Peak || Spacewatch || — || align=right | 1.7 km || 
|-id=222 bgcolor=#E9E9E9
| 304222 ||  || — || August 19, 2006 || Kitt Peak || Spacewatch || — || align=right | 2.4 km || 
|-id=223 bgcolor=#E9E9E9
| 304223 ||  || — || August 19, 2006 || Kitt Peak || Spacewatch || NEM || align=right | 2.8 km || 
|-id=224 bgcolor=#E9E9E9
| 304224 ||  || — || August 21, 2006 || Kitt Peak || Spacewatch || DOR || align=right | 2.5 km || 
|-id=225 bgcolor=#E9E9E9
| 304225 ||  || — || August 29, 2006 || Catalina || CSS || DOR || align=right | 2.8 km || 
|-id=226 bgcolor=#E9E9E9
| 304226 ||  || — || August 29, 2006 || Anderson Mesa || LONEOS || JUN || align=right | 1.7 km || 
|-id=227 bgcolor=#E9E9E9
| 304227 ||  || — || August 30, 2006 || Anderson Mesa || LONEOS || — || align=right | 2.5 km || 
|-id=228 bgcolor=#E9E9E9
| 304228 ||  || — || August 21, 2006 || Kitt Peak || Spacewatch || — || align=right | 2.7 km || 
|-id=229 bgcolor=#E9E9E9
| 304229 ||  || — || August 21, 2006 || Kitt Peak || Spacewatch || AER || align=right | 1.6 km || 
|-id=230 bgcolor=#E9E9E9
| 304230 ||  || — || August 18, 2006 || Kitt Peak || Spacewatch || AST || align=right | 2.0 km || 
|-id=231 bgcolor=#d6d6d6
| 304231 ||  || — || August 18, 2006 || Kitt Peak || Spacewatch || KOR || align=right | 1.5 km || 
|-id=232 bgcolor=#E9E9E9
| 304232 ||  || — || August 24, 2006 || Palomar || NEAT || TIN || align=right | 1.0 km || 
|-id=233 bgcolor=#d6d6d6
| 304233 Majaess ||  ||  || September 14, 2006 || Mauna Kea || D. D. Balam || — || align=right | 3.1 km || 
|-id=234 bgcolor=#E9E9E9
| 304234 ||  || — || September 14, 2006 || Catalina || CSS || GEF || align=right | 2.0 km || 
|-id=235 bgcolor=#E9E9E9
| 304235 ||  || — || September 13, 2006 || Palomar || NEAT || — || align=right | 4.2 km || 
|-id=236 bgcolor=#E9E9E9
| 304236 ||  || — || September 12, 2006 || Catalina || CSS || — || align=right | 3.1 km || 
|-id=237 bgcolor=#E9E9E9
| 304237 ||  || — || September 12, 2006 || Catalina || CSS || NEM || align=right | 2.9 km || 
|-id=238 bgcolor=#d6d6d6
| 304238 ||  || — || March 17, 2005 || Kitt Peak || Spacewatch || BRA || align=right | 1.4 km || 
|-id=239 bgcolor=#E9E9E9
| 304239 ||  || — || September 14, 2006 || Catalina || CSS || — || align=right | 3.3 km || 
|-id=240 bgcolor=#E9E9E9
| 304240 ||  || — || September 15, 2006 || Socorro || LINEAR || GEF || align=right | 1.7 km || 
|-id=241 bgcolor=#d6d6d6
| 304241 ||  || — || September 14, 2006 || Kitt Peak || Spacewatch || CHA || align=right | 1.8 km || 
|-id=242 bgcolor=#d6d6d6
| 304242 ||  || — || September 14, 2006 || Kitt Peak || Spacewatch || — || align=right | 2.6 km || 
|-id=243 bgcolor=#E9E9E9
| 304243 ||  || — || September 15, 2006 || Kitt Peak || Spacewatch || ADE || align=right | 2.3 km || 
|-id=244 bgcolor=#E9E9E9
| 304244 ||  || — || September 15, 2006 || Kitt Peak || Spacewatch || — || align=right | 2.0 km || 
|-id=245 bgcolor=#E9E9E9
| 304245 ||  || — || September 12, 2006 || Catalina || CSS || — || align=right | 2.6 km || 
|-id=246 bgcolor=#d6d6d6
| 304246 ||  || — || September 14, 2006 || Kitt Peak || Spacewatch || — || align=right | 2.6 km || 
|-id=247 bgcolor=#E9E9E9
| 304247 ||  || — || September 14, 2006 || Kitt Peak || Spacewatch || — || align=right | 2.3 km || 
|-id=248 bgcolor=#E9E9E9
| 304248 ||  || — || September 14, 2006 || Kitt Peak || Spacewatch || AGN || align=right | 1.7 km || 
|-id=249 bgcolor=#E9E9E9
| 304249 ||  || — || September 14, 2006 || Kitt Peak || Spacewatch || WIT || align=right | 1.3 km || 
|-id=250 bgcolor=#E9E9E9
| 304250 ||  || — || September 14, 2006 || Kitt Peak || Spacewatch || — || align=right | 2.5 km || 
|-id=251 bgcolor=#E9E9E9
| 304251 ||  || — || September 14, 2006 || Kitt Peak || Spacewatch || — || align=right | 3.1 km || 
|-id=252 bgcolor=#E9E9E9
| 304252 ||  || — || September 14, 2006 || Kitt Peak || Spacewatch || HOF || align=right | 2.9 km || 
|-id=253 bgcolor=#d6d6d6
| 304253 ||  || — || September 14, 2006 || Kitt Peak || Spacewatch || — || align=right | 3.7 km || 
|-id=254 bgcolor=#d6d6d6
| 304254 ||  || — || September 14, 2006 || Kitt Peak || Spacewatch || KOR || align=right | 1.7 km || 
|-id=255 bgcolor=#E9E9E9
| 304255 ||  || — || September 14, 2006 || Palomar || NEAT || — || align=right | 2.9 km || 
|-id=256 bgcolor=#E9E9E9
| 304256 ||  || — || September 14, 2006 || Palomar || NEAT || INO || align=right | 1.3 km || 
|-id=257 bgcolor=#d6d6d6
| 304257 ||  || — || September 14, 2006 || Kitt Peak || Spacewatch || — || align=right | 2.8 km || 
|-id=258 bgcolor=#E9E9E9
| 304258 ||  || — || September 15, 2006 || Kitt Peak || Spacewatch || WIT || align=right | 1.2 km || 
|-id=259 bgcolor=#E9E9E9
| 304259 ||  || — || September 15, 2006 || Kitt Peak || Spacewatch || — || align=right | 1.7 km || 
|-id=260 bgcolor=#E9E9E9
| 304260 ||  || — || September 15, 2006 || Kitt Peak || Spacewatch || HNA || align=right | 2.3 km || 
|-id=261 bgcolor=#d6d6d6
| 304261 ||  || — || September 15, 2006 || Kitt Peak || Spacewatch || K-2 || align=right | 1.9 km || 
|-id=262 bgcolor=#E9E9E9
| 304262 ||  || — || September 15, 2006 || Kitt Peak || Spacewatch || — || align=right | 2.5 km || 
|-id=263 bgcolor=#d6d6d6
| 304263 ||  || — || September 15, 2006 || Kitt Peak || Spacewatch || CHA || align=right | 2.1 km || 
|-id=264 bgcolor=#d6d6d6
| 304264 ||  || — || September 15, 2006 || Kitt Peak || Spacewatch || KOR || align=right | 1.4 km || 
|-id=265 bgcolor=#E9E9E9
| 304265 ||  || — || September 15, 2006 || Kitt Peak || Spacewatch || — || align=right | 2.4 km || 
|-id=266 bgcolor=#E9E9E9
| 304266 ||  || — || September 15, 2006 || Kitt Peak || Spacewatch || WIT || align=right | 1.3 km || 
|-id=267 bgcolor=#E9E9E9
| 304267 ||  || — || September 15, 2006 || Kitt Peak || Spacewatch || HOF || align=right | 3.1 km || 
|-id=268 bgcolor=#d6d6d6
| 304268 ||  || — || September 15, 2006 || Kitt Peak || Spacewatch || — || align=right | 2.7 km || 
|-id=269 bgcolor=#d6d6d6
| 304269 ||  || — || September 15, 2006 || Kitt Peak || Spacewatch || KAR || align=right | 1.3 km || 
|-id=270 bgcolor=#E9E9E9
| 304270 ||  || — || September 14, 2006 || Palomar || NEAT || — || align=right | 2.7 km || 
|-id=271 bgcolor=#E9E9E9
| 304271 ||  || — || September 6, 2006 || Palomar || NEAT || — || align=right | 2.4 km || 
|-id=272 bgcolor=#E9E9E9
| 304272 ||  || — || September 11, 2006 || Apache Point || A. C. Becker || MRX || align=right | 1.0 km || 
|-id=273 bgcolor=#E9E9E9
| 304273 ||  || — || September 14, 2006 || Mauna Kea || J. Masiero || — || align=right | 2.4 km || 
|-id=274 bgcolor=#E9E9E9
| 304274 ||  || — || September 15, 2006 || Kitt Peak || Spacewatch || HEN || align=right | 1.2 km || 
|-id=275 bgcolor=#E9E9E9
| 304275 ||  || — || September 16, 2006 || Kitt Peak || Spacewatch || — || align=right | 1.3 km || 
|-id=276 bgcolor=#E9E9E9
| 304276 ||  || — || September 17, 2006 || Catalina || CSS || HOF || align=right | 3.2 km || 
|-id=277 bgcolor=#d6d6d6
| 304277 ||  || — || September 19, 2006 || Vallemare Borbon || V. S. Casulli || KOR || align=right | 1.5 km || 
|-id=278 bgcolor=#E9E9E9
| 304278 ||  || — || September 16, 2006 || Catalina || CSS || DOR || align=right | 2.9 km || 
|-id=279 bgcolor=#E9E9E9
| 304279 ||  || — || September 17, 2006 || Kitt Peak || Spacewatch || — || align=right | 2.1 km || 
|-id=280 bgcolor=#E9E9E9
| 304280 ||  || — || September 17, 2006 || Kitt Peak || Spacewatch || WIT || align=right | 1.3 km || 
|-id=281 bgcolor=#E9E9E9
| 304281 ||  || — || September 18, 2006 || Kitt Peak || Spacewatch || GEF || align=right | 1.6 km || 
|-id=282 bgcolor=#E9E9E9
| 304282 ||  || — || September 19, 2006 || Catalina || CSS || — || align=right | 2.6 km || 
|-id=283 bgcolor=#E9E9E9
| 304283 ||  || — || September 18, 2006 || Anderson Mesa || LONEOS || — || align=right | 2.6 km || 
|-id=284 bgcolor=#E9E9E9
| 304284 ||  || — || September 20, 2006 || La Sagra || OAM Obs. || — || align=right | 2.5 km || 
|-id=285 bgcolor=#E9E9E9
| 304285 ||  || — || September 20, 2006 || Kitt Peak || Spacewatch || — || align=right | 2.0 km || 
|-id=286 bgcolor=#E9E9E9
| 304286 ||  || — || September 18, 2006 || Catalina || CSS || GEF || align=right | 1.8 km || 
|-id=287 bgcolor=#E9E9E9
| 304287 ||  || — || September 18, 2006 || Catalina || CSS || WIT || align=right | 1.7 km || 
|-id=288 bgcolor=#d6d6d6
| 304288 ||  || — || September 19, 2006 || Goodricke-Pigott || R. A. Tucker || EUP || align=right | 5.9 km || 
|-id=289 bgcolor=#E9E9E9
| 304289 ||  || — || September 19, 2006 || Kitt Peak || Spacewatch || PAD || align=right | 2.2 km || 
|-id=290 bgcolor=#E9E9E9
| 304290 ||  || — || September 19, 2006 || Kitt Peak || Spacewatch || — || align=right | 2.5 km || 
|-id=291 bgcolor=#d6d6d6
| 304291 ||  || — || September 19, 2006 || Kitt Peak || Spacewatch || EOS || align=right | 1.8 km || 
|-id=292 bgcolor=#FA8072
| 304292 ||  || — || September 18, 2006 || Catalina || CSS || — || align=right | 1.8 km || 
|-id=293 bgcolor=#FFC2E0
| 304293 ||  || — || September 25, 2006 || Catalina || CSS || APO || align=right data-sort-value="0.63" | 630 m || 
|-id=294 bgcolor=#d6d6d6
| 304294 ||  || — || September 18, 2006 || Kitt Peak || Spacewatch || — || align=right | 2.1 km || 
|-id=295 bgcolor=#E9E9E9
| 304295 ||  || — || September 18, 2006 || Kitt Peak || Spacewatch || — || align=right | 2.7 km || 
|-id=296 bgcolor=#d6d6d6
| 304296 ||  || — || September 18, 2006 || Kitt Peak || Spacewatch || — || align=right | 2.4 km || 
|-id=297 bgcolor=#d6d6d6
| 304297 ||  || — || September 18, 2006 || Kitt Peak || Spacewatch || — || align=right | 2.2 km || 
|-id=298 bgcolor=#E9E9E9
| 304298 ||  || — || September 19, 2006 || Anderson Mesa || LONEOS || AGN || align=right | 1.3 km || 
|-id=299 bgcolor=#E9E9E9
| 304299 ||  || — || September 19, 2006 || Catalina || CSS || PAD || align=right | 2.1 km || 
|-id=300 bgcolor=#d6d6d6
| 304300 ||  || — || September 19, 2006 || Kitt Peak || Spacewatch || — || align=right | 2.1 km || 
|}

304301–304400 

|-bgcolor=#d6d6d6
| 304301 ||  || — || September 19, 2006 || Kitt Peak || Spacewatch || — || align=right | 2.0 km || 
|-id=302 bgcolor=#d6d6d6
| 304302 ||  || — || September 24, 2006 || Kitt Peak || Spacewatch || — || align=right | 4.2 km || 
|-id=303 bgcolor=#E9E9E9
| 304303 ||  || — || September 18, 2006 || Anderson Mesa || LONEOS || MRX || align=right | 1.2 km || 
|-id=304 bgcolor=#E9E9E9
| 304304 ||  || — || September 19, 2006 || Anderson Mesa || LONEOS || AGN || align=right | 1.5 km || 
|-id=305 bgcolor=#E9E9E9
| 304305 ||  || — || September 21, 2006 || Anderson Mesa || LONEOS || — || align=right | 3.1 km || 
|-id=306 bgcolor=#d6d6d6
| 304306 ||  || — || September 25, 2006 || Anderson Mesa || LONEOS || NAE || align=right | 2.7 km || 
|-id=307 bgcolor=#E9E9E9
| 304307 ||  || — || September 19, 2006 || Catalina || CSS || — || align=right | 2.0 km || 
|-id=308 bgcolor=#d6d6d6
| 304308 ||  || — || September 19, 2006 || Kitt Peak || Spacewatch || K-2 || align=right | 1.4 km || 
|-id=309 bgcolor=#E9E9E9
| 304309 ||  || — || September 19, 2006 || Kitt Peak || Spacewatch || AGN || align=right | 1.2 km || 
|-id=310 bgcolor=#E9E9E9
| 304310 ||  || — || September 23, 2006 || Kitt Peak || Spacewatch || — || align=right | 1.9 km || 
|-id=311 bgcolor=#d6d6d6
| 304311 ||  || — || September 23, 2006 || Kitt Peak || Spacewatch || — || align=right | 2.8 km || 
|-id=312 bgcolor=#E9E9E9
| 304312 ||  || — || September 23, 2006 || Kitt Peak || Spacewatch || — || align=right | 2.5 km || 
|-id=313 bgcolor=#E9E9E9
| 304313 ||  || — || September 24, 2006 || Kitt Peak || Spacewatch || HOF || align=right | 2.6 km || 
|-id=314 bgcolor=#E9E9E9
| 304314 ||  || — || September 25, 2006 || Kitt Peak || Spacewatch || — || align=right | 2.7 km || 
|-id=315 bgcolor=#E9E9E9
| 304315 ||  || — || September 25, 2006 || Kitt Peak || Spacewatch || — || align=right | 3.0 km || 
|-id=316 bgcolor=#d6d6d6
| 304316 ||  || — || September 25, 2006 || Kitt Peak || Spacewatch || — || align=right | 2.9 km || 
|-id=317 bgcolor=#d6d6d6
| 304317 ||  || — || September 25, 2006 || Kitt Peak || Spacewatch || — || align=right | 2.0 km || 
|-id=318 bgcolor=#E9E9E9
| 304318 ||  || — || September 25, 2006 || Kitt Peak || Spacewatch || AGN || align=right | 1.6 km || 
|-id=319 bgcolor=#E9E9E9
| 304319 ||  || — || September 25, 2006 || Kitt Peak || Spacewatch || — || align=right | 2.3 km || 
|-id=320 bgcolor=#d6d6d6
| 304320 ||  || — || September 22, 2001 || Kitt Peak || Spacewatch || — || align=right | 2.8 km || 
|-id=321 bgcolor=#E9E9E9
| 304321 ||  || — || September 25, 2006 || Mount Lemmon || Mount Lemmon Survey || — || align=right | 2.3 km || 
|-id=322 bgcolor=#d6d6d6
| 304322 ||  || — || September 25, 2006 || Mount Lemmon || Mount Lemmon Survey || KOR || align=right | 1.3 km || 
|-id=323 bgcolor=#E9E9E9
| 304323 ||  || — || September 25, 2006 || Mount Lemmon || Mount Lemmon Survey || — || align=right | 2.2 km || 
|-id=324 bgcolor=#E9E9E9
| 304324 ||  || — || September 25, 2006 || Mount Lemmon || Mount Lemmon Survey || — || align=right | 2.3 km || 
|-id=325 bgcolor=#E9E9E9
| 304325 ||  || — || September 25, 2006 || Kitt Peak || Spacewatch || — || align=right | 3.6 km || 
|-id=326 bgcolor=#E9E9E9
| 304326 ||  || — || September 26, 2006 || Kitt Peak || Spacewatch || — || align=right | 2.7 km || 
|-id=327 bgcolor=#E9E9E9
| 304327 ||  || — || September 24, 2006 || Kitt Peak || Spacewatch || — || align=right | 3.2 km || 
|-id=328 bgcolor=#E9E9E9
| 304328 ||  || — || September 25, 2006 || Kitt Peak || Spacewatch || — || align=right | 2.9 km || 
|-id=329 bgcolor=#d6d6d6
| 304329 ||  || — || September 26, 2006 || Catalina || CSS || — || align=right | 3.6 km || 
|-id=330 bgcolor=#FFC2E0
| 304330 ||  || — || September 30, 2006 || Mount Lemmon || Mount Lemmon Survey || APOPHA || align=right data-sort-value="0.78" | 780 m || 
|-id=331 bgcolor=#E9E9E9
| 304331 ||  || — || September 25, 2006 || Mount Lemmon || Mount Lemmon Survey || NEM || align=right | 2.4 km || 
|-id=332 bgcolor=#d6d6d6
| 304332 ||  || — || September 25, 2006 || Mount Lemmon || Mount Lemmon Survey || KAR || align=right | 1.4 km || 
|-id=333 bgcolor=#E9E9E9
| 304333 ||  || — || June 13, 2005 || Mount Lemmon || Mount Lemmon Survey || — || align=right | 2.8 km || 
|-id=334 bgcolor=#d6d6d6
| 304334 ||  || — || September 26, 2006 || Kitt Peak || Spacewatch || — || align=right | 2.5 km || 
|-id=335 bgcolor=#d6d6d6
| 304335 ||  || — || September 26, 2006 || Kitt Peak || Spacewatch || — || align=right | 3.1 km || 
|-id=336 bgcolor=#E9E9E9
| 304336 ||  || — || September 26, 2006 || Kitt Peak || Spacewatch || — || align=right | 2.9 km || 
|-id=337 bgcolor=#E9E9E9
| 304337 ||  || — || September 26, 2006 || Kitt Peak || Spacewatch || — || align=right | 2.8 km || 
|-id=338 bgcolor=#d6d6d6
| 304338 ||  || — || September 26, 2006 || Kitt Peak || Spacewatch || KAR || align=right | 1.1 km || 
|-id=339 bgcolor=#E9E9E9
| 304339 ||  || — || September 26, 2006 || Mount Lemmon || Mount Lemmon Survey || — || align=right | 2.7 km || 
|-id=340 bgcolor=#E9E9E9
| 304340 ||  || — || September 26, 2006 || Kitt Peak || Spacewatch || — || align=right | 2.3 km || 
|-id=341 bgcolor=#d6d6d6
| 304341 ||  || — || September 26, 2006 || Kitt Peak || Spacewatch || KOR || align=right | 1.4 km || 
|-id=342 bgcolor=#d6d6d6
| 304342 ||  || — || September 26, 2006 || Kitt Peak || Spacewatch || KOR || align=right | 1.3 km || 
|-id=343 bgcolor=#d6d6d6
| 304343 ||  || — || September 26, 2006 || Mount Lemmon || Mount Lemmon Survey || — || align=right | 3.8 km || 
|-id=344 bgcolor=#E9E9E9
| 304344 ||  || — || September 26, 2006 || Kitt Peak || Spacewatch || — || align=right | 3.7 km || 
|-id=345 bgcolor=#E9E9E9
| 304345 ||  || — || September 26, 2006 || Kitt Peak || Spacewatch || — || align=right | 3.5 km || 
|-id=346 bgcolor=#E9E9E9
| 304346 ||  || — || September 26, 2006 || Kitt Peak || Spacewatch || AGN || align=right | 1.5 km || 
|-id=347 bgcolor=#d6d6d6
| 304347 ||  || — || September 27, 2006 || Mount Lemmon || Mount Lemmon Survey || EOS || align=right | 2.4 km || 
|-id=348 bgcolor=#E9E9E9
| 304348 ||  || — || September 25, 2006 || Anderson Mesa || LONEOS || — || align=right | 3.0 km || 
|-id=349 bgcolor=#d6d6d6
| 304349 ||  || — || September 25, 2006 || Kitt Peak || Spacewatch || — || align=right | 2.7 km || 
|-id=350 bgcolor=#E9E9E9
| 304350 ||  || — || September 18, 2006 || Calvin-Rehoboth || Calvin–Rehoboth Obs. || WIT || align=right | 1.1 km || 
|-id=351 bgcolor=#d6d6d6
| 304351 ||  || — || September 25, 2006 || Kitt Peak || Spacewatch || KOR || align=right | 1.4 km || 
|-id=352 bgcolor=#E9E9E9
| 304352 ||  || — || September 25, 2006 || Kitt Peak || Spacewatch || — || align=right | 2.4 km || 
|-id=353 bgcolor=#E9E9E9
| 304353 ||  || — || September 27, 2006 || Kitt Peak || Spacewatch || WIT || align=right | 1.5 km || 
|-id=354 bgcolor=#E9E9E9
| 304354 ||  || — || September 27, 2006 || Kitt Peak || Spacewatch || AGN || align=right | 1.3 km || 
|-id=355 bgcolor=#E9E9E9
| 304355 ||  || — || September 27, 2006 || Kitt Peak || Spacewatch || AGN || align=right | 1.2 km || 
|-id=356 bgcolor=#E9E9E9
| 304356 ||  || — || September 27, 2006 || Kitt Peak || Spacewatch || — || align=right | 2.1 km || 
|-id=357 bgcolor=#E9E9E9
| 304357 ||  || — || September 27, 2006 || Kitt Peak || Spacewatch || — || align=right | 2.6 km || 
|-id=358 bgcolor=#d6d6d6
| 304358 ||  || — || September 27, 2006 || Kitt Peak || Spacewatch || — || align=right | 2.4 km || 
|-id=359 bgcolor=#d6d6d6
| 304359 ||  || — || September 27, 2006 || Kitt Peak || Spacewatch || — || align=right | 2.8 km || 
|-id=360 bgcolor=#d6d6d6
| 304360 ||  || — || September 28, 2006 || Kitt Peak || Spacewatch || KOR || align=right | 2.3 km || 
|-id=361 bgcolor=#E9E9E9
| 304361 ||  || — || September 28, 2006 || Kitt Peak || Spacewatch || — || align=right | 2.9 km || 
|-id=362 bgcolor=#E9E9E9
| 304362 ||  || — || September 28, 2006 || Kitt Peak || Spacewatch || AGN || align=right | 1.3 km || 
|-id=363 bgcolor=#d6d6d6
| 304363 ||  || — || September 28, 2006 || Kitt Peak || Spacewatch || — || align=right | 3.4 km || 
|-id=364 bgcolor=#E9E9E9
| 304364 ||  || — || September 28, 2006 || Kitt Peak || Spacewatch || — || align=right | 2.6 km || 
|-id=365 bgcolor=#E9E9E9
| 304365 ||  || — || September 28, 2006 || Kitt Peak || Spacewatch || HOF || align=right | 3.5 km || 
|-id=366 bgcolor=#d6d6d6
| 304366 ||  || — || September 28, 2006 || Kitt Peak || Spacewatch || — || align=right | 3.2 km || 
|-id=367 bgcolor=#d6d6d6
| 304367 ||  || — || September 30, 2006 || Mount Lemmon || Mount Lemmon Survey || THM || align=right | 2.5 km || 
|-id=368 bgcolor=#d6d6d6
| 304368 Móricz ||  ||  || September 26, 2006 || Piszkéstető || K. Sárneczky, B. Csák || — || align=right | 3.1 km || 
|-id=369 bgcolor=#d6d6d6
| 304369 ||  || — || September 27, 2006 || Kitt Peak || Spacewatch || — || align=right | 3.0 km || 
|-id=370 bgcolor=#fefefe
| 304370 ||  || — || September 27, 2006 || Mount Lemmon || Mount Lemmon Survey || H || align=right data-sort-value="0.79" | 790 m || 
|-id=371 bgcolor=#d6d6d6
| 304371 ||  || — || September 16, 2006 || Apache Point || A. C. Becker || — || align=right | 4.0 km || 
|-id=372 bgcolor=#E9E9E9
| 304372 ||  || — || September 17, 2006 || Apache Point || A. C. Becker || INO || align=right | 1.2 km || 
|-id=373 bgcolor=#d6d6d6
| 304373 ||  || — || September 17, 2006 || Apache Point || A. C. Becker || — || align=right | 3.7 km || 
|-id=374 bgcolor=#d6d6d6
| 304374 ||  || — || September 18, 2006 || Apache Point || A. C. Becker || — || align=right | 2.5 km || 
|-id=375 bgcolor=#d6d6d6
| 304375 ||  || — || September 18, 2006 || Apache Point || A. C. Becker || — || align=right | 2.8 km || 
|-id=376 bgcolor=#d6d6d6
| 304376 ||  || — || September 28, 2006 || Apache Point || A. C. Becker || — || align=right | 2.3 km || 
|-id=377 bgcolor=#d6d6d6
| 304377 ||  || — || September 28, 2006 || Apache Point || A. C. Becker || — || align=right | 2.3 km || 
|-id=378 bgcolor=#d6d6d6
| 304378 ||  || — || September 28, 2006 || Apache Point || A. C. Becker || EOS || align=right | 2.1 km || 
|-id=379 bgcolor=#d6d6d6
| 304379 ||  || — || September 29, 2006 || Apache Point || A. C. Becker || — || align=right | 2.2 km || 
|-id=380 bgcolor=#d6d6d6
| 304380 ||  || — || September 29, 2006 || Apache Point || A. C. Becker || — || align=right | 3.7 km || 
|-id=381 bgcolor=#E9E9E9
| 304381 ||  || — || September 30, 2006 || Apache Point || A. C. Becker || — || align=right | 3.1 km || 
|-id=382 bgcolor=#d6d6d6
| 304382 ||  || — || September 26, 2006 || Kitt Peak || Spacewatch || TEL || align=right | 1.9 km || 
|-id=383 bgcolor=#d6d6d6
| 304383 ||  || — || September 27, 2006 || Mount Lemmon || Mount Lemmon Survey || — || align=right | 3.3 km || 
|-id=384 bgcolor=#d6d6d6
| 304384 ||  || — || September 28, 2006 || Catalina || CSS || — || align=right | 3.2 km || 
|-id=385 bgcolor=#d6d6d6
| 304385 ||  || — || September 28, 2006 || Mount Lemmon || Mount Lemmon Survey || KAR || align=right | 1.2 km || 
|-id=386 bgcolor=#E9E9E9
| 304386 ||  || — || September 17, 2006 || Kitt Peak || Spacewatch || XIZ || align=right | 1.4 km || 
|-id=387 bgcolor=#E9E9E9
| 304387 ||  || — || September 18, 2006 || Kitt Peak || Spacewatch || AGN || align=right | 1.4 km || 
|-id=388 bgcolor=#d6d6d6
| 304388 ||  || — || September 30, 2006 || Mount Lemmon || Mount Lemmon Survey || EOS || align=right | 2.0 km || 
|-id=389 bgcolor=#d6d6d6
| 304389 ||  || — || September 18, 2006 || Kitt Peak || Spacewatch || EOS || align=right | 1.8 km || 
|-id=390 bgcolor=#d6d6d6
| 304390 ||  || — || September 27, 2006 || Mount Lemmon || Mount Lemmon Survey || — || align=right | 2.8 km || 
|-id=391 bgcolor=#d6d6d6
| 304391 ||  || — || September 27, 2006 || Mount Lemmon || Mount Lemmon Survey || — || align=right | 3.6 km || 
|-id=392 bgcolor=#E9E9E9
| 304392 ||  || — || September 24, 2006 || Kitt Peak || Spacewatch || AGN || align=right | 1.1 km || 
|-id=393 bgcolor=#fefefe
| 304393 ||  || — || September 26, 2006 || Mount Lemmon || Mount Lemmon Survey || H || align=right data-sort-value="0.77" | 770 m || 
|-id=394 bgcolor=#d6d6d6
| 304394 ||  || — || October 3, 2006 || Mount Lemmon || Mount Lemmon Survey || — || align=right | 2.9 km || 
|-id=395 bgcolor=#E9E9E9
| 304395 ||  || — || October 1, 2006 || Socorro || LINEAR || NEM || align=right | 2.8 km || 
|-id=396 bgcolor=#d6d6d6
| 304396 ||  || — || October 2, 2006 || Mount Lemmon || Mount Lemmon Survey || CHA || align=right | 2.3 km || 
|-id=397 bgcolor=#E9E9E9
| 304397 ||  || — || October 2, 2006 || Catalina || CSS || AGN || align=right | 1.6 km || 
|-id=398 bgcolor=#d6d6d6
| 304398 ||  || — || October 4, 2006 || Mount Lemmon || Mount Lemmon Survey || KAR || align=right | 1.1 km || 
|-id=399 bgcolor=#E9E9E9
| 304399 ||  || — || October 11, 2006 || Kitt Peak || Spacewatch || WIT || align=right | 1.3 km || 
|-id=400 bgcolor=#E9E9E9
| 304400 ||  || — || October 11, 2006 || Kitt Peak || Spacewatch || — || align=right | 2.8 km || 
|}

304401–304500 

|-bgcolor=#d6d6d6
| 304401 ||  || — || October 11, 2006 || Kitt Peak || Spacewatch || TEL || align=right | 1.5 km || 
|-id=402 bgcolor=#d6d6d6
| 304402 ||  || — || October 12, 2006 || Kitt Peak || Spacewatch || — || align=right | 2.3 km || 
|-id=403 bgcolor=#d6d6d6
| 304403 ||  || — || October 12, 2006 || Kitt Peak || Spacewatch || — || align=right | 2.2 km || 
|-id=404 bgcolor=#d6d6d6
| 304404 ||  || — || October 12, 2006 || Kitt Peak || Spacewatch || — || align=right | 4.2 km || 
|-id=405 bgcolor=#d6d6d6
| 304405 ||  || — || October 12, 2006 || Kitt Peak || Spacewatch || CHA || align=right | 2.3 km || 
|-id=406 bgcolor=#d6d6d6
| 304406 ||  || — || October 12, 2006 || Kitt Peak || Spacewatch || — || align=right | 3.2 km || 
|-id=407 bgcolor=#d6d6d6
| 304407 ||  || — || October 12, 2006 || Kitt Peak || Spacewatch || KOR || align=right | 1.7 km || 
|-id=408 bgcolor=#d6d6d6
| 304408 ||  || — || October 12, 2006 || Kitt Peak || Spacewatch || EOS || align=right | 3.8 km || 
|-id=409 bgcolor=#d6d6d6
| 304409 ||  || — || October 12, 2006 || Kitt Peak || Spacewatch || KOR || align=right | 1.8 km || 
|-id=410 bgcolor=#d6d6d6
| 304410 ||  || — || October 12, 2006 || Kitt Peak || Spacewatch || — || align=right | 2.3 km || 
|-id=411 bgcolor=#d6d6d6
| 304411 ||  || — || October 12, 2006 || Kitt Peak || Spacewatch || — || align=right | 4.0 km || 
|-id=412 bgcolor=#d6d6d6
| 304412 ||  || — || October 12, 2006 || Kitt Peak || Spacewatch || — || align=right | 2.7 km || 
|-id=413 bgcolor=#d6d6d6
| 304413 ||  || — || October 12, 2006 || Kitt Peak || Spacewatch || — || align=right | 2.6 km || 
|-id=414 bgcolor=#d6d6d6
| 304414 ||  || — || October 12, 2006 || Kitt Peak || Spacewatch || — || align=right | 3.9 km || 
|-id=415 bgcolor=#d6d6d6
| 304415 ||  || — || October 12, 2006 || Kitt Peak || Spacewatch || — || align=right | 3.2 km || 
|-id=416 bgcolor=#d6d6d6
| 304416 ||  || — || October 14, 2006 || Sandlot || Sandlot Obs. || — || align=right | 2.9 km || 
|-id=417 bgcolor=#fefefe
| 304417 ||  || — || October 15, 2006 || Kitt Peak || Spacewatch || H || align=right data-sort-value="0.76" | 760 m || 
|-id=418 bgcolor=#d6d6d6
| 304418 ||  || — || October 15, 2006 || Catalina || CSS || — || align=right | 3.6 km || 
|-id=419 bgcolor=#d6d6d6
| 304419 ||  || — || October 10, 2006 || Palomar || NEAT || — || align=right | 3.2 km || 
|-id=420 bgcolor=#E9E9E9
| 304420 ||  || — || October 11, 2006 || Palomar || NEAT || GEF || align=right | 1.6 km || 
|-id=421 bgcolor=#E9E9E9
| 304421 ||  || — || October 11, 2006 || Kitt Peak || Spacewatch || — || align=right | 3.0 km || 
|-id=422 bgcolor=#d6d6d6
| 304422 ||  || — || October 11, 2006 || Kitt Peak || Spacewatch || EOS || align=right | 1.7 km || 
|-id=423 bgcolor=#E9E9E9
| 304423 ||  || — || October 11, 2006 || Palomar || NEAT || — || align=right | 5.4 km || 
|-id=424 bgcolor=#d6d6d6
| 304424 ||  || — || October 11, 2006 || Palomar || NEAT || — || align=right | 4.4 km || 
|-id=425 bgcolor=#d6d6d6
| 304425 ||  || — || October 11, 2006 || Palomar || NEAT || — || align=right | 4.4 km || 
|-id=426 bgcolor=#d6d6d6
| 304426 ||  || — || October 12, 2006 || Kitt Peak || Spacewatch || KOR || align=right | 1.4 km || 
|-id=427 bgcolor=#d6d6d6
| 304427 ||  || — || October 13, 2006 || Kitt Peak || Spacewatch || — || align=right | 3.7 km || 
|-id=428 bgcolor=#d6d6d6
| 304428 ||  || — || October 13, 2006 || Kitt Peak || Spacewatch || EOS || align=right | 1.9 km || 
|-id=429 bgcolor=#d6d6d6
| 304429 ||  || — || October 13, 2006 || Kitt Peak || Spacewatch || — || align=right | 3.8 km || 
|-id=430 bgcolor=#d6d6d6
| 304430 ||  || — || October 13, 2006 || Kitt Peak || Spacewatch || ALA || align=right | 6.4 km || 
|-id=431 bgcolor=#d6d6d6
| 304431 ||  || — || October 13, 2006 || Kitt Peak || Spacewatch || — || align=right | 3.1 km || 
|-id=432 bgcolor=#d6d6d6
| 304432 ||  || — || October 13, 2006 || Kitt Peak || Spacewatch || — || align=right | 3.4 km || 
|-id=433 bgcolor=#d6d6d6
| 304433 ||  || — || October 13, 2006 || Kitt Peak || Spacewatch || — || align=right | 3.0 km || 
|-id=434 bgcolor=#E9E9E9
| 304434 ||  || — || October 15, 2006 || Catalina || CSS || HOF || align=right | 3.1 km || 
|-id=435 bgcolor=#d6d6d6
| 304435 ||  || — || October 13, 2006 || Kitt Peak || Spacewatch || — || align=right | 4.8 km || 
|-id=436 bgcolor=#d6d6d6
| 304436 ||  || — || October 15, 2006 || Kitt Peak || Spacewatch || Tj (2.99) || align=right | 4.5 km || 
|-id=437 bgcolor=#d6d6d6
| 304437 ||  || — || October 15, 2006 || Kitt Peak || Spacewatch || — || align=right | 3.6 km || 
|-id=438 bgcolor=#E9E9E9
| 304438 ||  || — || October 15, 2006 || Kitt Peak || Spacewatch || — || align=right | 3.2 km || 
|-id=439 bgcolor=#d6d6d6
| 304439 ||  || — || October 4, 2006 || Mount Lemmon || Mount Lemmon Survey || — || align=right | 2.2 km || 
|-id=440 bgcolor=#d6d6d6
| 304440 ||  || — || October 12, 2006 || Kitt Peak || Spacewatch || — || align=right | 3.0 km || 
|-id=441 bgcolor=#d6d6d6
| 304441 ||  || — || October 12, 2006 || Apache Point || A. C. Becker || — || align=right | 3.3 km || 
|-id=442 bgcolor=#d6d6d6
| 304442 ||  || — || October 4, 2006 || Mount Lemmon || Mount Lemmon Survey || — || align=right | 2.6 km || 
|-id=443 bgcolor=#d6d6d6
| 304443 ||  || — || October 1, 2006 || Kitt Peak || Spacewatch || — || align=right | 2.7 km || 
|-id=444 bgcolor=#d6d6d6
| 304444 ||  || — || October 2, 2006 || Kitt Peak || Spacewatch || — || align=right | 2.4 km || 
|-id=445 bgcolor=#d6d6d6
| 304445 ||  || — || October 11, 2006 || Palomar || NEAT || — || align=right | 3.6 km || 
|-id=446 bgcolor=#d6d6d6
| 304446 ||  || — || October 16, 2006 || Piszkéstető || K. Sárneczky, Z. Kuli || — || align=right | 2.8 km || 
|-id=447 bgcolor=#E9E9E9
| 304447 ||  || — || October 16, 2006 || Catalina || CSS || INO || align=right | 1.9 km || 
|-id=448 bgcolor=#d6d6d6
| 304448 ||  || — || October 16, 2006 || Kitt Peak || Spacewatch || — || align=right | 3.6 km || 
|-id=449 bgcolor=#d6d6d6
| 304449 ||  || — || October 16, 2006 || Kitt Peak || Spacewatch || KOR || align=right | 1.5 km || 
|-id=450 bgcolor=#E9E9E9
| 304450 ||  || — || October 17, 2006 || Mount Lemmon || Mount Lemmon Survey || — || align=right | 3.1 km || 
|-id=451 bgcolor=#d6d6d6
| 304451 ||  || — || October 17, 2006 || Mount Lemmon || Mount Lemmon Survey || — || align=right | 3.2 km || 
|-id=452 bgcolor=#d6d6d6
| 304452 ||  || — || October 17, 2006 || Mount Lemmon || Mount Lemmon Survey || KOR || align=right | 1.5 km || 
|-id=453 bgcolor=#d6d6d6
| 304453 ||  || — || October 17, 2006 || Mount Lemmon || Mount Lemmon Survey || — || align=right | 2.7 km || 
|-id=454 bgcolor=#E9E9E9
| 304454 ||  || — || October 16, 2006 || Kitt Peak || Spacewatch || AGN || align=right | 1.2 km || 
|-id=455 bgcolor=#E9E9E9
| 304455 ||  || — || October 16, 2006 || Kitt Peak || Spacewatch || AGN || align=right | 1.4 km || 
|-id=456 bgcolor=#d6d6d6
| 304456 ||  || — || October 16, 2006 || Mount Lemmon || Mount Lemmon Survey || — || align=right | 3.0 km || 
|-id=457 bgcolor=#E9E9E9
| 304457 ||  || — || October 16, 2006 || Mount Lemmon || Mount Lemmon Survey || — || align=right | 2.8 km || 
|-id=458 bgcolor=#E9E9E9
| 304458 ||  || — || October 16, 2006 || Kitt Peak || Spacewatch || HOF || align=right | 3.3 km || 
|-id=459 bgcolor=#E9E9E9
| 304459 ||  || — || October 16, 2006 || Kitt Peak || Spacewatch || AGN || align=right | 1.6 km || 
|-id=460 bgcolor=#d6d6d6
| 304460 ||  || — || October 16, 2006 || Kitt Peak || Spacewatch || CHA || align=right | 2.2 km || 
|-id=461 bgcolor=#d6d6d6
| 304461 ||  || — || October 16, 2006 || Kitt Peak || Spacewatch || KOR || align=right | 1.2 km || 
|-id=462 bgcolor=#d6d6d6
| 304462 ||  || — || October 16, 2006 || Kitt Peak || Spacewatch || TEL || align=right | 1.6 km || 
|-id=463 bgcolor=#d6d6d6
| 304463 ||  || — || October 16, 2006 || Kitt Peak || Spacewatch || — || align=right | 2.3 km || 
|-id=464 bgcolor=#d6d6d6
| 304464 ||  || — || October 16, 2006 || Kitt Peak || Spacewatch || KOR || align=right | 1.3 km || 
|-id=465 bgcolor=#d6d6d6
| 304465 ||  || — || October 16, 2006 || Kitt Peak || Spacewatch || — || align=right | 3.6 km || 
|-id=466 bgcolor=#E9E9E9
| 304466 ||  || — || October 17, 2006 || Kitt Peak || Spacewatch || — || align=right | 3.2 km || 
|-id=467 bgcolor=#d6d6d6
| 304467 ||  || — || October 17, 2006 || Kitt Peak || Spacewatch || — || align=right | 2.2 km || 
|-id=468 bgcolor=#E9E9E9
| 304468 ||  || — || October 18, 2006 || Kitt Peak || Spacewatch || ADE || align=right | 3.2 km || 
|-id=469 bgcolor=#E9E9E9
| 304469 ||  || — || October 16, 2006 || Catalina || CSS || — || align=right | 4.0 km || 
|-id=470 bgcolor=#E9E9E9
| 304470 ||  || — || October 16, 2006 || Catalina || CSS || — || align=right | 3.5 km || 
|-id=471 bgcolor=#d6d6d6
| 304471 ||  || — || October 17, 2006 || Kitt Peak || Spacewatch || — || align=right | 3.1 km || 
|-id=472 bgcolor=#d6d6d6
| 304472 ||  || — || October 17, 2006 || Catalina || CSS || — || align=right | 3.1 km || 
|-id=473 bgcolor=#d6d6d6
| 304473 ||  || — || October 17, 2006 || Kitt Peak || Spacewatch || CHA || align=right | 2.4 km || 
|-id=474 bgcolor=#d6d6d6
| 304474 ||  || — || October 17, 2006 || Mount Lemmon || Mount Lemmon Survey || — || align=right | 3.6 km || 
|-id=475 bgcolor=#d6d6d6
| 304475 ||  || — || October 17, 2006 || Mount Lemmon || Mount Lemmon Survey || EOS || align=right | 2.3 km || 
|-id=476 bgcolor=#d6d6d6
| 304476 ||  || — || October 17, 2006 || Mount Lemmon || Mount Lemmon Survey || KOR || align=right | 1.4 km || 
|-id=477 bgcolor=#d6d6d6
| 304477 ||  || — || September 27, 2006 || Mount Lemmon || Mount Lemmon Survey || — || align=right | 3.8 km || 
|-id=478 bgcolor=#d6d6d6
| 304478 ||  || — || October 17, 2006 || Kitt Peak || Spacewatch || — || align=right | 5.6 km || 
|-id=479 bgcolor=#d6d6d6
| 304479 ||  || — || October 17, 2006 || Kitt Peak || Spacewatch || — || align=right | 2.8 km || 
|-id=480 bgcolor=#d6d6d6
| 304480 ||  || — || October 17, 2006 || Kitt Peak || Spacewatch || — || align=right | 2.8 km || 
|-id=481 bgcolor=#d6d6d6
| 304481 ||  || — || October 18, 2006 || Kitt Peak || Spacewatch || — || align=right | 3.6 km || 
|-id=482 bgcolor=#d6d6d6
| 304482 ||  || — || October 18, 2006 || Kitt Peak || Spacewatch || — || align=right | 2.8 km || 
|-id=483 bgcolor=#d6d6d6
| 304483 ||  || — || October 18, 2006 || Kitt Peak || Spacewatch || — || align=right | 2.6 km || 
|-id=484 bgcolor=#d6d6d6
| 304484 ||  || — || October 18, 2006 || Kitt Peak || Spacewatch || KOR || align=right | 1.4 km || 
|-id=485 bgcolor=#d6d6d6
| 304485 ||  || — || October 18, 2006 || Kitt Peak || Spacewatch || — || align=right | 3.2 km || 
|-id=486 bgcolor=#d6d6d6
| 304486 ||  || — || October 18, 2006 || Kitt Peak || Spacewatch || — || align=right | 4.2 km || 
|-id=487 bgcolor=#d6d6d6
| 304487 ||  || — || October 19, 2006 || Kitt Peak || Spacewatch || — || align=right | 3.2 km || 
|-id=488 bgcolor=#E9E9E9
| 304488 ||  || — || October 19, 2006 || Kitt Peak || Spacewatch || HOF || align=right | 2.7 km || 
|-id=489 bgcolor=#d6d6d6
| 304489 ||  || — || October 19, 2006 || Kitt Peak || Spacewatch || KOR || align=right | 1.4 km || 
|-id=490 bgcolor=#d6d6d6
| 304490 ||  || — || October 19, 2006 || Kitt Peak || Spacewatch || — || align=right | 2.4 km || 
|-id=491 bgcolor=#d6d6d6
| 304491 ||  || — || October 19, 2006 || Kitt Peak || Spacewatch || KOR || align=right | 1.2 km || 
|-id=492 bgcolor=#E9E9E9
| 304492 ||  || — || October 19, 2006 || Kitt Peak || Spacewatch || — || align=right | 2.7 km || 
|-id=493 bgcolor=#E9E9E9
| 304493 ||  || — || October 19, 2006 || Mount Lemmon || Mount Lemmon Survey || AGN || align=right | 1.1 km || 
|-id=494 bgcolor=#d6d6d6
| 304494 ||  || — || October 19, 2006 || Kitt Peak || Spacewatch || — || align=right | 3.1 km || 
|-id=495 bgcolor=#d6d6d6
| 304495 ||  || — || October 19, 2006 || Mount Lemmon || Mount Lemmon Survey || HYG || align=right | 2.5 km || 
|-id=496 bgcolor=#d6d6d6
| 304496 ||  || — || October 19, 2006 || Kitt Peak || Spacewatch || — || align=right | 3.0 km || 
|-id=497 bgcolor=#d6d6d6
| 304497 ||  || — || October 19, 2006 || Mount Lemmon || Mount Lemmon Survey || THM || align=right | 2.9 km || 
|-id=498 bgcolor=#E9E9E9
| 304498 ||  || — || October 21, 2006 || Kitt Peak || Spacewatch || HNA || align=right | 2.8 km || 
|-id=499 bgcolor=#E9E9E9
| 304499 ||  || — || October 21, 2006 || Mount Lemmon || Mount Lemmon Survey || AGN || align=right | 1.3 km || 
|-id=500 bgcolor=#d6d6d6
| 304500 ||  || — || October 21, 2006 || Mount Lemmon || Mount Lemmon Survey || KOR || align=right | 1.6 km || 
|}

304501–304600 

|-bgcolor=#E9E9E9
| 304501 ||  || — || October 21, 2006 || Mount Lemmon || Mount Lemmon Survey || — || align=right | 3.0 km || 
|-id=502 bgcolor=#d6d6d6
| 304502 ||  || — || October 21, 2006 || Mount Lemmon || Mount Lemmon Survey || — || align=right | 4.4 km || 
|-id=503 bgcolor=#E9E9E9
| 304503 ||  || — || October 16, 2006 || Catalina || CSS || PAD || align=right | 3.3 km || 
|-id=504 bgcolor=#d6d6d6
| 304504 ||  || — || October 16, 2006 || Catalina || CSS || — || align=right | 2.6 km || 
|-id=505 bgcolor=#d6d6d6
| 304505 ||  || — || October 16, 2006 || Catalina || CSS || — || align=right | 2.9 km || 
|-id=506 bgcolor=#d6d6d6
| 304506 ||  || — || October 19, 2006 || Catalina || CSS || — || align=right | 3.2 km || 
|-id=507 bgcolor=#d6d6d6
| 304507 ||  || — || October 19, 2006 || Kitt Peak || Spacewatch || — || align=right | 5.0 km || 
|-id=508 bgcolor=#d6d6d6
| 304508 ||  || — || October 20, 2006 || Kitt Peak || Spacewatch || — || align=right | 2.4 km || 
|-id=509 bgcolor=#d6d6d6
| 304509 ||  || — || October 20, 2006 || Kitt Peak || Spacewatch || — || align=right | 3.2 km || 
|-id=510 bgcolor=#d6d6d6
| 304510 ||  || — || October 21, 2006 || Kitt Peak || Spacewatch || — || align=right | 3.2 km || 
|-id=511 bgcolor=#E9E9E9
| 304511 ||  || — || October 22, 2006 || Palomar || NEAT || HEN || align=right | 1.4 km || 
|-id=512 bgcolor=#d6d6d6
| 304512 ||  || — || October 22, 2006 || Palomar || NEAT || CHA || align=right | 2.6 km || 
|-id=513 bgcolor=#d6d6d6
| 304513 ||  || — || October 23, 2006 || Kitt Peak || Spacewatch || KAR || align=right | 1.0 km || 
|-id=514 bgcolor=#d6d6d6
| 304514 ||  || — || October 23, 2006 || Kitt Peak || Spacewatch || EOS || align=right | 2.1 km || 
|-id=515 bgcolor=#d6d6d6
| 304515 ||  || — || October 23, 2006 || Kitt Peak || Spacewatch || — || align=right | 2.7 km || 
|-id=516 bgcolor=#d6d6d6
| 304516 ||  || — || October 23, 2006 || Kitt Peak || Spacewatch || EOS || align=right | 2.2 km || 
|-id=517 bgcolor=#d6d6d6
| 304517 ||  || — || October 23, 2006 || Kitt Peak || Spacewatch || CHA || align=right | 1.9 km || 
|-id=518 bgcolor=#E9E9E9
| 304518 ||  || — || October 27, 2006 || Calvin-Rehoboth || L. A. Molnar || — || align=right | 2.8 km || 
|-id=519 bgcolor=#d6d6d6
| 304519 ||  || — || October 27, 2006 || Nyukasa || Mount Nyukasa Stn. || HYG || align=right | 3.0 km || 
|-id=520 bgcolor=#d6d6d6
| 304520 ||  || — || October 16, 2006 || Catalina || CSS || 615 || align=right | 1.7 km || 
|-id=521 bgcolor=#d6d6d6
| 304521 ||  || — || October 20, 2006 || Palomar || NEAT || — || align=right | 3.4 km || 
|-id=522 bgcolor=#d6d6d6
| 304522 ||  || — || October 20, 2006 || Palomar || NEAT || — || align=right | 3.5 km || 
|-id=523 bgcolor=#d6d6d6
| 304523 ||  || — || October 22, 2006 || Mount Lemmon || Mount Lemmon Survey || — || align=right | 4.3 km || 
|-id=524 bgcolor=#d6d6d6
| 304524 ||  || — || October 23, 2006 || Kitt Peak || Spacewatch || CHA || align=right | 2.3 km || 
|-id=525 bgcolor=#d6d6d6
| 304525 ||  || — || October 27, 2006 || Mount Lemmon || Mount Lemmon Survey || CHA || align=right | 1.7 km || 
|-id=526 bgcolor=#d6d6d6
| 304526 ||  || — || October 27, 2006 || Catalina || CSS || — || align=right | 4.2 km || 
|-id=527 bgcolor=#E9E9E9
| 304527 ||  || — || October 28, 2006 || Kitt Peak || Spacewatch || — || align=right | 3.0 km || 
|-id=528 bgcolor=#d6d6d6
| 304528 ||  || — || October 31, 2006 || Bergisch Gladbach || W. Bickel || — || align=right | 2.6 km || 
|-id=529 bgcolor=#E9E9E9
| 304529 ||  || — || October 27, 2006 || Kitt Peak || Spacewatch || — || align=right | 3.0 km || 
|-id=530 bgcolor=#d6d6d6
| 304530 ||  || — || October 27, 2006 || Catalina || CSS || — || align=right | 3.7 km || 
|-id=531 bgcolor=#d6d6d6
| 304531 ||  || — || October 27, 2006 || Mount Lemmon || Mount Lemmon Survey || CHA || align=right | 2.2 km || 
|-id=532 bgcolor=#d6d6d6
| 304532 ||  || — || October 27, 2006 || Kitt Peak || Spacewatch || EOS || align=right | 2.4 km || 
|-id=533 bgcolor=#d6d6d6
| 304533 ||  || — || October 27, 2006 || Kitt Peak || Spacewatch || — || align=right | 3.1 km || 
|-id=534 bgcolor=#d6d6d6
| 304534 ||  || — || October 27, 2006 || Mount Lemmon || Mount Lemmon Survey || EOS || align=right | 2.2 km || 
|-id=535 bgcolor=#d6d6d6
| 304535 ||  || — || October 27, 2006 || Mount Lemmon || Mount Lemmon Survey || URS || align=right | 3.3 km || 
|-id=536 bgcolor=#d6d6d6
| 304536 ||  || — || October 27, 2006 || Mount Lemmon || Mount Lemmon Survey || — || align=right | 3.9 km || 
|-id=537 bgcolor=#d6d6d6
| 304537 ||  || — || October 28, 2006 || Kitt Peak || Spacewatch || CHA || align=right | 2.3 km || 
|-id=538 bgcolor=#d6d6d6
| 304538 ||  || — || October 28, 2006 || Mount Lemmon || Mount Lemmon Survey || — || align=right | 2.6 km || 
|-id=539 bgcolor=#d6d6d6
| 304539 ||  || — || October 28, 2006 || Mount Lemmon || Mount Lemmon Survey || — || align=right | 3.0 km || 
|-id=540 bgcolor=#d6d6d6
| 304540 ||  || — || October 28, 2006 || Kitt Peak || Spacewatch || — || align=right | 3.7 km || 
|-id=541 bgcolor=#d6d6d6
| 304541 ||  || — || October 28, 2006 || Kitt Peak || Spacewatch || — || align=right | 2.2 km || 
|-id=542 bgcolor=#d6d6d6
| 304542 ||  || — || October 28, 2006 || Kitt Peak || Spacewatch || EOS || align=right | 1.9 km || 
|-id=543 bgcolor=#d6d6d6
| 304543 ||  || — || October 28, 2006 || Mount Lemmon || Mount Lemmon Survey || — || align=right | 4.6 km || 
|-id=544 bgcolor=#d6d6d6
| 304544 ||  || — || October 28, 2006 || Kitt Peak || Spacewatch || — || align=right | 2.7 km || 
|-id=545 bgcolor=#d6d6d6
| 304545 ||  || — || October 29, 2006 || Kitt Peak || Spacewatch || — || align=right | 2.7 km || 
|-id=546 bgcolor=#d6d6d6
| 304546 ||  || — || October 31, 2006 || Kitt Peak || Spacewatch || EOS || align=right | 1.8 km || 
|-id=547 bgcolor=#d6d6d6
| 304547 ||  || — || October 19, 2006 || Kitt Peak || M. W. Buie || — || align=right | 4.0 km || 
|-id=548 bgcolor=#d6d6d6
| 304548 ||  || — || October 21, 2006 || Mount Lemmon || Mount Lemmon Survey || KOR || align=right | 1.4 km || 
|-id=549 bgcolor=#d6d6d6
| 304549 ||  || — || October 20, 2006 || Kitt Peak || M. W. Buie || SAN || align=right | 1.3 km || 
|-id=550 bgcolor=#d6d6d6
| 304550 ||  || — || October 16, 2006 || Kitt Peak || Spacewatch || — || align=right | 2.7 km || 
|-id=551 bgcolor=#d6d6d6
| 304551 ||  || — || October 19, 2006 || Mount Lemmon || Mount Lemmon Survey || — || align=right | 2.8 km || 
|-id=552 bgcolor=#d6d6d6
| 304552 ||  || — || October 21, 2006 || Kitt Peak || Spacewatch || — || align=right | 2.9 km || 
|-id=553 bgcolor=#d6d6d6
| 304553 ||  || — || October 21, 2006 || Apache Point || A. C. Becker || FIR || align=right | 3.5 km || 
|-id=554 bgcolor=#d6d6d6
| 304554 ||  || — || October 21, 2006 || Apache Point || A. C. Becker || — || align=right | 2.4 km || 
|-id=555 bgcolor=#d6d6d6
| 304555 ||  || — || October 20, 2006 || Kitt Peak || Spacewatch || — || align=right | 3.3 km || 
|-id=556 bgcolor=#d6d6d6
| 304556 ||  || — || October 22, 2006 || Mount Lemmon || Mount Lemmon Survey || KOR || align=right | 1.7 km || 
|-id=557 bgcolor=#d6d6d6
| 304557 ||  || — || October 26, 2006 || Mauna Kea || P. A. Wiegert || KOR || align=right | 1.5 km || 
|-id=558 bgcolor=#d6d6d6
| 304558 ||  || — || October 22, 2006 || Kitt Peak || Spacewatch || — || align=right | 2.6 km || 
|-id=559 bgcolor=#d6d6d6
| 304559 ||  || — || October 17, 2006 || Mount Lemmon || Mount Lemmon Survey || KOR || align=right | 1.5 km || 
|-id=560 bgcolor=#d6d6d6
| 304560 ||  || — || November 9, 2006 || Kitt Peak || Spacewatch || — || align=right | 2.5 km || 
|-id=561 bgcolor=#d6d6d6
| 304561 ||  || — || November 10, 2006 || Kitt Peak || Spacewatch || — || align=right | 2.2 km || 
|-id=562 bgcolor=#d6d6d6
| 304562 ||  || — || November 10, 2006 || Kitt Peak || Spacewatch || — || align=right | 3.7 km || 
|-id=563 bgcolor=#d6d6d6
| 304563 ||  || — || November 10, 2006 || Kitt Peak || Spacewatch || — || align=right | 4.0 km || 
|-id=564 bgcolor=#d6d6d6
| 304564 ||  || — || November 10, 2006 || Kitt Peak || Spacewatch || HYG || align=right | 2.5 km || 
|-id=565 bgcolor=#d6d6d6
| 304565 ||  || — || November 11, 2006 || Kitt Peak || Spacewatch || — || align=right | 3.4 km || 
|-id=566 bgcolor=#d6d6d6
| 304566 ||  || — || November 11, 2006 || Catalina || CSS || — || align=right | 2.2 km || 
|-id=567 bgcolor=#d6d6d6
| 304567 ||  || — || November 11, 2006 || Mount Lemmon || Mount Lemmon Survey || KOR || align=right | 1.7 km || 
|-id=568 bgcolor=#d6d6d6
| 304568 ||  || — || November 9, 2006 || Kitt Peak || Spacewatch || — || align=right | 4.6 km || 
|-id=569 bgcolor=#d6d6d6
| 304569 ||  || — || November 9, 2006 || Kitt Peak || Spacewatch || MEL || align=right | 4.5 km || 
|-id=570 bgcolor=#d6d6d6
| 304570 ||  || — || November 10, 2006 || Kitt Peak || Spacewatch || EOS || align=right | 2.7 km || 
|-id=571 bgcolor=#d6d6d6
| 304571 ||  || — || November 10, 2006 || Kitt Peak || Spacewatch || HYG || align=right | 2.5 km || 
|-id=572 bgcolor=#d6d6d6
| 304572 ||  || — || November 10, 2006 || Kitt Peak || Spacewatch || — || align=right | 4.1 km || 
|-id=573 bgcolor=#E9E9E9
| 304573 ||  || — || November 11, 2006 || Kitt Peak || Spacewatch || — || align=right | 2.1 km || 
|-id=574 bgcolor=#d6d6d6
| 304574 ||  || — || November 11, 2006 || Catalina || CSS || — || align=right | 3.2 km || 
|-id=575 bgcolor=#d6d6d6
| 304575 ||  || — || November 11, 2006 || Mount Lemmon || Mount Lemmon Survey || — || align=right | 3.1 km || 
|-id=576 bgcolor=#d6d6d6
| 304576 ||  || — || November 11, 2006 || Catalina || CSS || — || align=right | 4.6 km || 
|-id=577 bgcolor=#d6d6d6
| 304577 ||  || — || October 12, 2006 || Kitt Peak || Spacewatch || HYG || align=right | 2.9 km || 
|-id=578 bgcolor=#d6d6d6
| 304578 ||  || — || October 22, 2006 || Kitt Peak || Spacewatch || — || align=right | 2.6 km || 
|-id=579 bgcolor=#d6d6d6
| 304579 ||  || — || November 12, 2006 || Mount Lemmon || Mount Lemmon Survey || — || align=right | 4.1 km || 
|-id=580 bgcolor=#d6d6d6
| 304580 ||  || — || November 1, 2006 || Kitt Peak || Spacewatch || KAR || align=right | 1.2 km || 
|-id=581 bgcolor=#d6d6d6
| 304581 ||  || — || November 9, 2006 || Kitt Peak || Spacewatch || CHA || align=right | 2.1 km || 
|-id=582 bgcolor=#d6d6d6
| 304582 ||  || — || November 9, 2006 || Kitt Peak || Spacewatch || EOS || align=right | 2.0 km || 
|-id=583 bgcolor=#d6d6d6
| 304583 ||  || — || November 10, 2006 || Kitt Peak || Spacewatch || — || align=right | 2.6 km || 
|-id=584 bgcolor=#d6d6d6
| 304584 ||  || — || November 10, 2006 || Kitt Peak || Spacewatch || — || align=right | 3.2 km || 
|-id=585 bgcolor=#d6d6d6
| 304585 ||  || — || November 10, 2006 || Kitt Peak || Spacewatch || — || align=right | 2.9 km || 
|-id=586 bgcolor=#d6d6d6
| 304586 ||  || — || November 10, 2006 || Kitt Peak || Spacewatch || — || align=right | 3.0 km || 
|-id=587 bgcolor=#d6d6d6
| 304587 ||  || — || November 11, 2006 || Kitt Peak || Spacewatch || — || align=right | 4.4 km || 
|-id=588 bgcolor=#d6d6d6
| 304588 ||  || — || November 11, 2006 || Kitt Peak || Spacewatch || HYG || align=right | 2.9 km || 
|-id=589 bgcolor=#d6d6d6
| 304589 ||  || — || November 11, 2006 || Kitt Peak || Spacewatch || CHA || align=right | 2.8 km || 
|-id=590 bgcolor=#d6d6d6
| 304590 ||  || — || November 11, 2006 || Kitt Peak || Spacewatch || — || align=right | 2.9 km || 
|-id=591 bgcolor=#d6d6d6
| 304591 ||  || — || November 11, 2006 || Kitt Peak || Spacewatch || — || align=right | 2.6 km || 
|-id=592 bgcolor=#d6d6d6
| 304592 ||  || — || November 11, 2006 || Kitt Peak || Spacewatch || — || align=right | 3.0 km || 
|-id=593 bgcolor=#d6d6d6
| 304593 ||  || — || November 11, 2006 || Kitt Peak || Spacewatch || LAU || align=right | 1.4 km || 
|-id=594 bgcolor=#d6d6d6
| 304594 ||  || — || November 11, 2006 || Kitt Peak || Spacewatch || THM || align=right | 2.4 km || 
|-id=595 bgcolor=#d6d6d6
| 304595 ||  || — || November 11, 2006 || Kitt Peak || Spacewatch || EOS || align=right | 2.8 km || 
|-id=596 bgcolor=#d6d6d6
| 304596 ||  || — || November 11, 2006 || Kitt Peak || Spacewatch || — || align=right | 3.8 km || 
|-id=597 bgcolor=#d6d6d6
| 304597 ||  || — || November 11, 2006 || Kitt Peak || Spacewatch || — || align=right | 3.0 km || 
|-id=598 bgcolor=#d6d6d6
| 304598 ||  || — || November 11, 2006 || Kitt Peak || Spacewatch || THM || align=right | 1.8 km || 
|-id=599 bgcolor=#d6d6d6
| 304599 ||  || — || November 11, 2006 || Kitt Peak || Spacewatch || — || align=right | 2.8 km || 
|-id=600 bgcolor=#d6d6d6
| 304600 ||  || — || November 11, 2006 || Kitt Peak || Spacewatch || — || align=right | 2.4 km || 
|}

304601–304700 

|-bgcolor=#d6d6d6
| 304601 ||  || — || November 11, 2006 || Mount Lemmon || Mount Lemmon Survey || — || align=right | 4.2 km || 
|-id=602 bgcolor=#d6d6d6
| 304602 ||  || — || November 11, 2006 || Mount Lemmon || Mount Lemmon Survey || THM || align=right | 2.4 km || 
|-id=603 bgcolor=#d6d6d6
| 304603 ||  || — || November 11, 2006 || Mount Lemmon || Mount Lemmon Survey || — || align=right | 2.6 km || 
|-id=604 bgcolor=#d6d6d6
| 304604 ||  || — || November 11, 2006 || Kitt Peak || Spacewatch || — || align=right | 3.4 km || 
|-id=605 bgcolor=#d6d6d6
| 304605 ||  || — || November 12, 2006 || Mount Lemmon || Mount Lemmon Survey || — || align=right | 2.6 km || 
|-id=606 bgcolor=#d6d6d6
| 304606 ||  || — || November 12, 2006 || Lulin Observatory || H.-C. Lin, Q.-z. Ye || — || align=right | 3.0 km || 
|-id=607 bgcolor=#d6d6d6
| 304607 ||  || — || November 13, 2006 || Kitt Peak || Spacewatch || — || align=right | 2.5 km || 
|-id=608 bgcolor=#d6d6d6
| 304608 ||  || — || November 13, 2006 || Kitt Peak || Spacewatch || CHA || align=right | 1.9 km || 
|-id=609 bgcolor=#d6d6d6
| 304609 ||  || — || November 13, 2006 || Mount Lemmon || Mount Lemmon Survey || — || align=right | 2.1 km || 
|-id=610 bgcolor=#d6d6d6
| 304610 ||  || — || November 13, 2006 || Mount Lemmon || Mount Lemmon Survey || EOS || align=right | 2.2 km || 
|-id=611 bgcolor=#d6d6d6
| 304611 ||  || — || November 14, 2006 || Kitt Peak || Spacewatch || — || align=right | 2.9 km || 
|-id=612 bgcolor=#d6d6d6
| 304612 ||  || — || November 14, 2006 || Mount Lemmon || Mount Lemmon Survey || — || align=right | 3.1 km || 
|-id=613 bgcolor=#d6d6d6
| 304613 ||  || — || November 14, 2006 || Mount Lemmon || Mount Lemmon Survey || — || align=right | 3.3 km || 
|-id=614 bgcolor=#d6d6d6
| 304614 ||  || — || November 10, 2006 || Kitt Peak || Spacewatch || — || align=right | 3.8 km || 
|-id=615 bgcolor=#d6d6d6
| 304615 ||  || — || November 11, 2006 || Mount Lemmon || Mount Lemmon Survey || — || align=right | 2.9 km || 
|-id=616 bgcolor=#d6d6d6
| 304616 ||  || — || November 13, 2006 || Kitt Peak || Spacewatch || EOS || align=right | 2.0 km || 
|-id=617 bgcolor=#d6d6d6
| 304617 ||  || — || November 13, 2006 || Catalina || CSS || — || align=right | 3.9 km || 
|-id=618 bgcolor=#d6d6d6
| 304618 ||  || — || November 13, 2006 || Palomar || NEAT || TIR || align=right | 4.2 km || 
|-id=619 bgcolor=#d6d6d6
| 304619 ||  || — || November 13, 2006 || Catalina || CSS || — || align=right | 3.5 km || 
|-id=620 bgcolor=#d6d6d6
| 304620 ||  || — || November 14, 2006 || Kitt Peak || Spacewatch || KOR || align=right | 1.4 km || 
|-id=621 bgcolor=#d6d6d6
| 304621 ||  || — || November 14, 2006 || Mount Lemmon || Mount Lemmon Survey || VER || align=right | 2.4 km || 
|-id=622 bgcolor=#d6d6d6
| 304622 ||  || — || November 14, 2006 || Kitt Peak || Spacewatch || — || align=right | 2.5 km || 
|-id=623 bgcolor=#d6d6d6
| 304623 ||  || — || November 15, 2006 || Kitt Peak || Spacewatch || — || align=right | 3.9 km || 
|-id=624 bgcolor=#d6d6d6
| 304624 ||  || — || November 15, 2006 || Mount Lemmon || Mount Lemmon Survey || — || align=right | 3.3 km || 
|-id=625 bgcolor=#d6d6d6
| 304625 ||  || — || November 15, 2006 || Kitt Peak || Spacewatch || — || align=right | 4.3 km || 
|-id=626 bgcolor=#d6d6d6
| 304626 ||  || — || November 15, 2006 || Kitt Peak || Spacewatch || EOS || align=right | 1.9 km || 
|-id=627 bgcolor=#d6d6d6
| 304627 ||  || — || November 15, 2006 || Kitt Peak || Spacewatch || EOS || align=right | 2.8 km || 
|-id=628 bgcolor=#d6d6d6
| 304628 ||  || — || November 15, 2006 || Kitt Peak || Spacewatch || EOS || align=right | 2.6 km || 
|-id=629 bgcolor=#d6d6d6
| 304629 ||  || — || November 15, 2006 || Kitt Peak || Spacewatch || — || align=right | 2.7 km || 
|-id=630 bgcolor=#d6d6d6
| 304630 ||  || — || November 15, 2006 || Kitt Peak || Spacewatch || — || align=right | 2.5 km || 
|-id=631 bgcolor=#d6d6d6
| 304631 ||  || — || November 15, 2006 || Kitt Peak || Spacewatch || — || align=right | 3.3 km || 
|-id=632 bgcolor=#d6d6d6
| 304632 ||  || — || November 13, 2006 || Kitt Peak || Spacewatch || — || align=right | 2.5 km || 
|-id=633 bgcolor=#d6d6d6
| 304633 ||  || — || November 15, 2006 || Kitt Peak || Spacewatch || EOS || align=right | 2.0 km || 
|-id=634 bgcolor=#E9E9E9
| 304634 ||  || — || November 9, 2006 || Palomar || NEAT || AER || align=right | 1.9 km || 
|-id=635 bgcolor=#d6d6d6
| 304635 ||  || — || November 9, 2006 || Palomar || NEAT || — || align=right | 4.4 km || 
|-id=636 bgcolor=#d6d6d6
| 304636 ||  || — || November 9, 2006 || Palomar || NEAT || — || align=right | 4.5 km || 
|-id=637 bgcolor=#d6d6d6
| 304637 ||  || — || October 27, 2006 || Catalina || CSS || — || align=right | 3.0 km || 
|-id=638 bgcolor=#d6d6d6
| 304638 ||  || — || November 15, 2006 || Kitt Peak || Spacewatch || — || align=right | 3.5 km || 
|-id=639 bgcolor=#d6d6d6
| 304639 ||  || — || November 11, 2006 || Mount Lemmon || Mount Lemmon Survey || — || align=right | 3.6 km || 
|-id=640 bgcolor=#FFC2E0
| 304640 ||  || — || November 19, 2006 || Kitt Peak || Spacewatch || APO || align=right data-sort-value="0.53" | 530 m || 
|-id=641 bgcolor=#d6d6d6
| 304641 ||  || — || November 18, 2006 || La Sagra || OAM Obs. || — || align=right | 3.6 km || 
|-id=642 bgcolor=#d6d6d6
| 304642 ||  || — || November 16, 2006 || Kitt Peak || Spacewatch || — || align=right | 4.4 km || 
|-id=643 bgcolor=#d6d6d6
| 304643 ||  || — || November 16, 2006 || Kitt Peak || Spacewatch || — || align=right | 3.8 km || 
|-id=644 bgcolor=#d6d6d6
| 304644 ||  || — || November 16, 2006 || Kitt Peak || Spacewatch || — || align=right | 4.3 km || 
|-id=645 bgcolor=#d6d6d6
| 304645 ||  || — || November 16, 2006 || Kitt Peak || Spacewatch || HYG || align=right | 3.3 km || 
|-id=646 bgcolor=#fefefe
| 304646 ||  || — || November 16, 2006 || Socorro || LINEAR || H || align=right | 1.0 km || 
|-id=647 bgcolor=#d6d6d6
| 304647 ||  || — || November 16, 2006 || Mount Lemmon || Mount Lemmon Survey || — || align=right | 4.7 km || 
|-id=648 bgcolor=#d6d6d6
| 304648 ||  || — || November 16, 2006 || Mount Lemmon || Mount Lemmon Survey || — || align=right | 3.7 km || 
|-id=649 bgcolor=#d6d6d6
| 304649 ||  || — || November 16, 2006 || Kitt Peak || Spacewatch || — || align=right | 3.5 km || 
|-id=650 bgcolor=#d6d6d6
| 304650 ||  || — || November 17, 2006 || Kitt Peak || Spacewatch || — || align=right | 5.6 km || 
|-id=651 bgcolor=#d6d6d6
| 304651 ||  || — || November 17, 2006 || Mount Lemmon || Mount Lemmon Survey || — || align=right | 3.1 km || 
|-id=652 bgcolor=#d6d6d6
| 304652 ||  || — || November 17, 2006 || Mount Lemmon || Mount Lemmon Survey || — || align=right | 3.6 km || 
|-id=653 bgcolor=#d6d6d6
| 304653 ||  || — || November 17, 2006 || Mount Lemmon || Mount Lemmon Survey || — || align=right | 3.7 km || 
|-id=654 bgcolor=#E9E9E9
| 304654 ||  || — || November 18, 2006 || Mount Lemmon || Mount Lemmon Survey || AGN || align=right | 1.8 km || 
|-id=655 bgcolor=#d6d6d6
| 304655 ||  || — || October 13, 2006 || Kitt Peak || Spacewatch || — || align=right | 2.8 km || 
|-id=656 bgcolor=#d6d6d6
| 304656 ||  || — || November 22, 2006 || 7300 Observatory || W. K. Y. Yeung || — || align=right | 4.5 km || 
|-id=657 bgcolor=#d6d6d6
| 304657 ||  || — || November 22, 2006 || 7300 || W. K. Y. Yeung || EOS || align=right | 2.7 km || 
|-id=658 bgcolor=#d6d6d6
| 304658 ||  || — || November 23, 2006 || Kitt Peak || Spacewatch || — || align=right | 3.9 km || 
|-id=659 bgcolor=#d6d6d6
| 304659 ||  || — || November 16, 2006 || Kitt Peak || Spacewatch || EOS || align=right | 2.2 km || 
|-id=660 bgcolor=#d6d6d6
| 304660 ||  || — || November 16, 2006 || Kitt Peak || Spacewatch || THM || align=right | 2.9 km || 
|-id=661 bgcolor=#d6d6d6
| 304661 ||  || — || November 16, 2006 || Kitt Peak || Spacewatch || — || align=right | 3.6 km || 
|-id=662 bgcolor=#d6d6d6
| 304662 ||  || — || November 16, 2006 || Kitt Peak || Spacewatch || — || align=right | 4.1 km || 
|-id=663 bgcolor=#d6d6d6
| 304663 ||  || — || November 17, 2006 || Kitt Peak || Spacewatch || — || align=right | 3.4 km || 
|-id=664 bgcolor=#d6d6d6
| 304664 ||  || — || November 17, 2006 || Kitt Peak || Spacewatch || — || align=right | 7.7 km || 
|-id=665 bgcolor=#d6d6d6
| 304665 ||  || — || November 18, 2006 || Kitt Peak || Spacewatch || — || align=right | 2.1 km || 
|-id=666 bgcolor=#d6d6d6
| 304666 ||  || — || November 18, 2006 || Kitt Peak || Spacewatch || — || align=right | 2.7 km || 
|-id=667 bgcolor=#d6d6d6
| 304667 ||  || — || November 18, 2006 || Kitt Peak || Spacewatch || — || align=right | 3.2 km || 
|-id=668 bgcolor=#d6d6d6
| 304668 ||  || — || November 18, 2006 || Kitt Peak || Spacewatch || — || align=right | 3.3 km || 
|-id=669 bgcolor=#d6d6d6
| 304669 ||  || — || November 19, 2006 || Kitt Peak || Spacewatch || — || align=right | 3.8 km || 
|-id=670 bgcolor=#d6d6d6
| 304670 ||  || — || November 19, 2006 || Kitt Peak || Spacewatch || — || align=right | 3.0 km || 
|-id=671 bgcolor=#d6d6d6
| 304671 ||  || — || November 19, 2006 || Kitt Peak || Spacewatch || EOS || align=right | 2.0 km || 
|-id=672 bgcolor=#d6d6d6
| 304672 ||  || — || November 19, 2006 || Kitt Peak || Spacewatch || — || align=right | 2.4 km || 
|-id=673 bgcolor=#d6d6d6
| 304673 ||  || — || November 19, 2006 || Kitt Peak || Spacewatch || THM || align=right | 2.3 km || 
|-id=674 bgcolor=#d6d6d6
| 304674 ||  || — || November 19, 2006 || Kitt Peak || Spacewatch || HYG || align=right | 2.1 km || 
|-id=675 bgcolor=#d6d6d6
| 304675 ||  || — || November 19, 2006 || Kitt Peak || Spacewatch || — || align=right | 4.5 km || 
|-id=676 bgcolor=#d6d6d6
| 304676 ||  || — || November 19, 2006 || Socorro || LINEAR || — || align=right | 3.8 km || 
|-id=677 bgcolor=#d6d6d6
| 304677 ||  || — || November 19, 2006 || Kitt Peak || Spacewatch || HYG || align=right | 3.4 km || 
|-id=678 bgcolor=#d6d6d6
| 304678 ||  || — || November 19, 2006 || Kitt Peak || Spacewatch || — || align=right | 2.5 km || 
|-id=679 bgcolor=#d6d6d6
| 304679 ||  || — || November 19, 2006 || Kitt Peak || Spacewatch || — || align=right | 3.0 km || 
|-id=680 bgcolor=#d6d6d6
| 304680 ||  || — || November 19, 2006 || Kitt Peak || Spacewatch || — || align=right | 2.8 km || 
|-id=681 bgcolor=#d6d6d6
| 304681 ||  || — || November 19, 2006 || Kitt Peak || Spacewatch || — || align=right | 3.7 km || 
|-id=682 bgcolor=#d6d6d6
| 304682 ||  || — || November 19, 2006 || Socorro || LINEAR || — || align=right | 4.2 km || 
|-id=683 bgcolor=#d6d6d6
| 304683 ||  || — || November 21, 2006 || Socorro || LINEAR || EOS || align=right | 3.2 km || 
|-id=684 bgcolor=#d6d6d6
| 304684 ||  || — || November 22, 2006 || Catalina || CSS || TEL || align=right | 1.5 km || 
|-id=685 bgcolor=#d6d6d6
| 304685 ||  || — || November 19, 2006 || Kitt Peak || Spacewatch || HYG || align=right | 2.9 km || 
|-id=686 bgcolor=#d6d6d6
| 304686 ||  || — || November 19, 2006 || Kitt Peak || Spacewatch || THM || align=right | 1.8 km || 
|-id=687 bgcolor=#d6d6d6
| 304687 ||  || — || November 20, 2006 || Kitt Peak || Spacewatch || HYG || align=right | 2.9 km || 
|-id=688 bgcolor=#d6d6d6
| 304688 ||  || — || November 20, 2006 || Kitt Peak || Spacewatch || — || align=right | 2.7 km || 
|-id=689 bgcolor=#d6d6d6
| 304689 ||  || — || November 20, 2006 || Kitt Peak || Spacewatch || EOS || align=right | 2.9 km || 
|-id=690 bgcolor=#d6d6d6
| 304690 ||  || — || March 12, 2003 || Palomar || NEAT || EOS || align=right | 2.6 km || 
|-id=691 bgcolor=#d6d6d6
| 304691 ||  || — || November 23, 2006 || Kitt Peak || Spacewatch || — || align=right | 4.1 km || 
|-id=692 bgcolor=#d6d6d6
| 304692 ||  || — || November 23, 2006 || Kitt Peak || Spacewatch || — || align=right | 2.8 km || 
|-id=693 bgcolor=#d6d6d6
| 304693 ||  || — || November 23, 2006 || Kitt Peak || Spacewatch || — || align=right | 3.7 km || 
|-id=694 bgcolor=#d6d6d6
| 304694 ||  || — || November 23, 2006 || Kitt Peak || Spacewatch || — || align=right | 3.7 km || 
|-id=695 bgcolor=#d6d6d6
| 304695 ||  || — || November 23, 2006 || Kitt Peak || Spacewatch || — || align=right | 5.0 km || 
|-id=696 bgcolor=#d6d6d6
| 304696 ||  || — || November 23, 2006 || Kitt Peak || Spacewatch || — || align=right | 3.3 km || 
|-id=697 bgcolor=#d6d6d6
| 304697 ||  || — || November 23, 2006 || Kitt Peak || Spacewatch || EOS || align=right | 2.7 km || 
|-id=698 bgcolor=#d6d6d6
| 304698 ||  || — || November 23, 2006 || Kitt Peak || Spacewatch || VER || align=right | 3.4 km || 
|-id=699 bgcolor=#d6d6d6
| 304699 ||  || — || November 23, 2006 || Kitt Peak || Spacewatch || — || align=right | 2.3 km || 
|-id=700 bgcolor=#d6d6d6
| 304700 ||  || — || November 23, 2006 || Kitt Peak || Spacewatch || — || align=right | 3.0 km || 
|}

304701–304800 

|-bgcolor=#d6d6d6
| 304701 ||  || — || November 23, 2006 || Mount Lemmon || Mount Lemmon Survey || — || align=right | 2.9 km || 
|-id=702 bgcolor=#d6d6d6
| 304702 ||  || — || November 24, 2006 || Mount Lemmon || Mount Lemmon Survey || — || align=right | 3.1 km || 
|-id=703 bgcolor=#d6d6d6
| 304703 ||  || — || November 23, 2006 || Mount Lemmon || Mount Lemmon Survey || — || align=right | 3.1 km || 
|-id=704 bgcolor=#d6d6d6
| 304704 ||  || — || November 25, 2006 || Mount Lemmon || Mount Lemmon Survey || — || align=right | 2.8 km || 
|-id=705 bgcolor=#d6d6d6
| 304705 ||  || — || November 27, 2006 || Mount Lemmon || Mount Lemmon Survey || THM || align=right | 2.3 km || 
|-id=706 bgcolor=#d6d6d6
| 304706 ||  || — || November 29, 2006 || Socorro || LINEAR || — || align=right | 5.6 km || 
|-id=707 bgcolor=#d6d6d6
| 304707 ||  || — || November 29, 2006 || Socorro || LINEAR || — || align=right | 5.4 km || 
|-id=708 bgcolor=#d6d6d6
| 304708 ||  || — || November 19, 2006 || Kitt Peak || Spacewatch || EOS || align=right | 2.8 km || 
|-id=709 bgcolor=#d6d6d6
| 304709 ||  || — || November 19, 2006 || Catalina || CSS || — || align=right | 4.0 km || 
|-id=710 bgcolor=#d6d6d6
| 304710 ||  || — || November 25, 2006 || Kitt Peak || Spacewatch || — || align=right | 4.3 km || 
|-id=711 bgcolor=#d6d6d6
| 304711 ||  || — || November 19, 2006 || Kitt Peak || Spacewatch || — || align=right | 2.4 km || 
|-id=712 bgcolor=#d6d6d6
| 304712 ||  || — || November 17, 2006 || Kitt Peak || Spacewatch || EOS || align=right | 2.5 km || 
|-id=713 bgcolor=#d6d6d6
| 304713 ||  || — || November 25, 2006 || Mount Lemmon || Mount Lemmon Survey || — || align=right | 3.6 km || 
|-id=714 bgcolor=#d6d6d6
| 304714 ||  || — || December 11, 2006 || 7300 || W. K. Y. Yeung || KOR || align=right | 1.5 km || 
|-id=715 bgcolor=#d6d6d6
| 304715 ||  || — || December 1, 2006 || Mount Lemmon || Mount Lemmon Survey || TIR || align=right | 4.2 km || 
|-id=716 bgcolor=#d6d6d6
| 304716 ||  || — || December 1, 2006 || Mount Lemmon || Mount Lemmon Survey || — || align=right | 4.8 km || 
|-id=717 bgcolor=#d6d6d6
| 304717 ||  || — || December 7, 2006 || Palomar || NEAT || LIX || align=right | 4.4 km || 
|-id=718 bgcolor=#d6d6d6
| 304718 ||  || — || December 9, 2006 || Kitt Peak || Spacewatch || — || align=right | 4.8 km || 
|-id=719 bgcolor=#d6d6d6
| 304719 ||  || — || December 10, 2006 || Kitt Peak || Spacewatch || — || align=right | 3.0 km || 
|-id=720 bgcolor=#d6d6d6
| 304720 ||  || — || December 10, 2006 || Kitt Peak || Spacewatch || LUT || align=right | 6.7 km || 
|-id=721 bgcolor=#d6d6d6
| 304721 ||  || — || December 11, 2006 || Socorro || LINEAR || — || align=right | 5.7 km || 
|-id=722 bgcolor=#d6d6d6
| 304722 ||  || — || December 12, 2006 || Kitt Peak || Spacewatch || — || align=right | 4.1 km || 
|-id=723 bgcolor=#d6d6d6
| 304723 ||  || — || December 12, 2006 || Mount Lemmon || Mount Lemmon Survey || — || align=right | 3.9 km || 
|-id=724 bgcolor=#d6d6d6
| 304724 ||  || — || December 12, 2006 || Mount Lemmon || Mount Lemmon Survey || — || align=right | 3.5 km || 
|-id=725 bgcolor=#d6d6d6
| 304725 ||  || — || December 12, 2006 || Catalina || CSS || — || align=right | 4.7 km || 
|-id=726 bgcolor=#d6d6d6
| 304726 ||  || — || December 12, 2006 || Catalina || CSS || — || align=right | 3.5 km || 
|-id=727 bgcolor=#d6d6d6
| 304727 ||  || — || December 13, 2006 || Kitt Peak || Spacewatch || — || align=right | 4.7 km || 
|-id=728 bgcolor=#d6d6d6
| 304728 ||  || — || December 13, 2006 || Mount Lemmon || Mount Lemmon Survey || — || align=right | 3.2 km || 
|-id=729 bgcolor=#d6d6d6
| 304729 ||  || — || December 15, 2006 || Farra d'Isonzo || Farra d'Isonzo || — || align=right | 3.3 km || 
|-id=730 bgcolor=#d6d6d6
| 304730 ||  || — || December 9, 2006 || Kitt Peak || Spacewatch || HYG || align=right | 3.0 km || 
|-id=731 bgcolor=#d6d6d6
| 304731 ||  || — || December 11, 2006 || Kitt Peak || Spacewatch || EUP || align=right | 5.1 km || 
|-id=732 bgcolor=#d6d6d6
| 304732 ||  || — || December 11, 2006 || Kitt Peak || Spacewatch || — || align=right | 4.2 km || 
|-id=733 bgcolor=#d6d6d6
| 304733 ||  || — || December 11, 2006 || Kitt Peak || Spacewatch || — || align=right | 3.5 km || 
|-id=734 bgcolor=#d6d6d6
| 304734 ||  || — || December 11, 2006 || Kitt Peak || Spacewatch || — || align=right | 3.4 km || 
|-id=735 bgcolor=#d6d6d6
| 304735 ||  || — || December 12, 2006 || Kitt Peak || Spacewatch || — || align=right | 2.7 km || 
|-id=736 bgcolor=#d6d6d6
| 304736 ||  || — || December 12, 2006 || Kitt Peak || Spacewatch || — || align=right | 3.3 km || 
|-id=737 bgcolor=#d6d6d6
| 304737 ||  || — || December 13, 2006 || Catalina || CSS || — || align=right | 3.5 km || 
|-id=738 bgcolor=#d6d6d6
| 304738 ||  || — || December 13, 2006 || Mount Lemmon || Mount Lemmon Survey || HYG || align=right | 3.0 km || 
|-id=739 bgcolor=#d6d6d6
| 304739 ||  || — || December 13, 2006 || Mount Lemmon || Mount Lemmon Survey || — || align=right | 2.3 km || 
|-id=740 bgcolor=#d6d6d6
| 304740 ||  || — || December 12, 2006 || Palomar || NEAT || — || align=right | 4.8 km || 
|-id=741 bgcolor=#d6d6d6
| 304741 ||  || — || December 12, 2006 || Palomar || NEAT || — || align=right | 4.9 km || 
|-id=742 bgcolor=#d6d6d6
| 304742 ||  || — || December 13, 2006 || Mount Lemmon || Mount Lemmon Survey || — || align=right | 3.2 km || 
|-id=743 bgcolor=#d6d6d6
| 304743 ||  || — || December 13, 2006 || Mount Lemmon || Mount Lemmon Survey || THM || align=right | 2.2 km || 
|-id=744 bgcolor=#d6d6d6
| 304744 ||  || — || December 10, 2006 || Kitt Peak || Spacewatch || HYG || align=right | 2.9 km || 
|-id=745 bgcolor=#d6d6d6
| 304745 ||  || — || December 16, 2006 || Mount Lemmon || Mount Lemmon Survey || — || align=right | 4.6 km || 
|-id=746 bgcolor=#d6d6d6
| 304746 ||  || — || December 17, 2006 || Mount Lemmon || Mount Lemmon Survey || HYG || align=right | 2.5 km || 
|-id=747 bgcolor=#fefefe
| 304747 ||  || — || December 21, 2006 || Anderson Mesa || LONEOS || H || align=right data-sort-value="0.82" | 820 m || 
|-id=748 bgcolor=#d6d6d6
| 304748 ||  || — || December 22, 2006 || Piszkéstető || K. Sárneczky || — || align=right | 3.4 km || 
|-id=749 bgcolor=#d6d6d6
| 304749 ||  || — || November 16, 2006 || Kitt Peak || Spacewatch || EOS || align=right | 2.7 km || 
|-id=750 bgcolor=#d6d6d6
| 304750 ||  || — || December 21, 2006 || Kitt Peak || Spacewatch || KOR || align=right | 1.5 km || 
|-id=751 bgcolor=#d6d6d6
| 304751 ||  || — || December 21, 2006 || Kitt Peak || Spacewatch || — || align=right | 2.6 km || 
|-id=752 bgcolor=#d6d6d6
| 304752 ||  || — || December 21, 2006 || Kitt Peak || Spacewatch || — || align=right | 6.4 km || 
|-id=753 bgcolor=#d6d6d6
| 304753 ||  || — || December 23, 2006 || Mount Lemmon || Mount Lemmon Survey || EOS || align=right | 2.7 km || 
|-id=754 bgcolor=#d6d6d6
| 304754 ||  || — || December 21, 2006 || Mount Lemmon || Mount Lemmon Survey || HYG || align=right | 3.4 km || 
|-id=755 bgcolor=#d6d6d6
| 304755 ||  || — || January 8, 2007 || Catalina || CSS || TIR || align=right | 4.3 km || 
|-id=756 bgcolor=#d6d6d6
| 304756 ||  || — || January 9, 2007 || Kitt Peak || Spacewatch || — || align=right | 2.5 km || 
|-id=757 bgcolor=#d6d6d6
| 304757 ||  || — || January 15, 2007 || Catalina || CSS || LIX || align=right | 4.5 km || 
|-id=758 bgcolor=#d6d6d6
| 304758 ||  || — || January 15, 2007 || Catalina || CSS || MEL || align=right | 4.5 km || 
|-id=759 bgcolor=#d6d6d6
| 304759 ||  || — || January 17, 2007 || Mount Lemmon || Mount Lemmon Survey || — || align=right | 3.5 km || 
|-id=760 bgcolor=#d6d6d6
| 304760 ||  || — || January 24, 2007 || Socorro || LINEAR || — || align=right | 3.4 km || 
|-id=761 bgcolor=#d6d6d6
| 304761 ||  || — || January 24, 2007 || Mount Lemmon || Mount Lemmon Survey || THM || align=right | 2.3 km || 
|-id=762 bgcolor=#FA8072
| 304762 ||  || — || February 6, 2007 || Palomar || NEAT || H || align=right data-sort-value="0.91" | 910 m || 
|-id=763 bgcolor=#d6d6d6
| 304763 ||  || — || February 9, 2007 || Kitt Peak || Spacewatch || — || align=right | 2.8 km || 
|-id=764 bgcolor=#d6d6d6
| 304764 ||  || — || February 8, 2007 || Palomar || NEAT || HYG || align=right | 3.3 km || 
|-id=765 bgcolor=#d6d6d6
| 304765 ||  || — || February 17, 2007 || Kitt Peak || Spacewatch || — || align=right | 4.9 km || 
|-id=766 bgcolor=#d6d6d6
| 304766 ||  || — || February 17, 2007 || Kitt Peak || Spacewatch || HYG || align=right | 2.7 km || 
|-id=767 bgcolor=#fefefe
| 304767 ||  || — || February 17, 2007 || Kitt Peak || Spacewatch || — || align=right data-sort-value="0.61" | 610 m || 
|-id=768 bgcolor=#d6d6d6
| 304768 ||  || — || February 19, 2007 || Kitt Peak || Spacewatch || — || align=right | 2.7 km || 
|-id=769 bgcolor=#d6d6d6
| 304769 ||  || — || February 23, 2007 || Kitt Peak || Spacewatch || THM || align=right | 2.6 km || 
|-id=770 bgcolor=#C2FFFF
| 304770 ||  || — || March 10, 2007 || Kitt Peak || Spacewatch || L5 || align=right | 17 km || 
|-id=771 bgcolor=#fefefe
| 304771 ||  || — || March 12, 2007 || Mount Lemmon || Mount Lemmon Survey || — || align=right data-sort-value="0.68" | 680 m || 
|-id=772 bgcolor=#fefefe
| 304772 ||  || — || March 13, 2007 || Catalina || CSS || H || align=right data-sort-value="0.91" | 910 m || 
|-id=773 bgcolor=#C2FFFF
| 304773 ||  || — || March 13, 2007 || Kitt Peak || Spacewatch || L5 || align=right | 11 km || 
|-id=774 bgcolor=#C2FFFF
| 304774 ||  || — || April 14, 2007 || Mount Lemmon || Mount Lemmon Survey || L5 || align=right | 11 km || 
|-id=775 bgcolor=#fefefe
| 304775 ||  || — || April 14, 2007 || Kitt Peak || Spacewatch || FLO || align=right data-sort-value="0.78" | 780 m || 
|-id=776 bgcolor=#fefefe
| 304776 ||  || — || April 15, 2007 || Kitt Peak || Spacewatch || — || align=right data-sort-value="0.67" | 670 m || 
|-id=777 bgcolor=#fefefe
| 304777 ||  || — || April 18, 2007 || Mount Lemmon || Mount Lemmon Survey || — || align=right | 1.2 km || 
|-id=778 bgcolor=#fefefe
| 304778 ||  || — || April 16, 2007 || Catalina || CSS || — || align=right data-sort-value="0.89" | 890 m || 
|-id=779 bgcolor=#fefefe
| 304779 ||  || — || April 25, 2007 || Kitt Peak || Spacewatch || FLO || align=right data-sort-value="0.67" | 670 m || 
|-id=780 bgcolor=#fefefe
| 304780 ||  || — || June 12, 2007 || Kitt Peak || Spacewatch || — || align=right | 1.1 km || 
|-id=781 bgcolor=#fefefe
| 304781 ||  || — || June 14, 2007 || Siding Spring || SSS || — || align=right | 1.1 km || 
|-id=782 bgcolor=#FA8072
| 304782 ||  || — || June 18, 2007 || Catalina || CSS || — || align=right | 1.4 km || 
|-id=783 bgcolor=#fefefe
| 304783 ||  || — || June 18, 2007 || Kitt Peak || Spacewatch || — || align=right | 1.0 km || 
|-id=784 bgcolor=#fefefe
| 304784 ||  || — || June 20, 2007 || Kitt Peak || Spacewatch || FLO || align=right data-sort-value="0.77" | 770 m || 
|-id=785 bgcolor=#fefefe
| 304785 ||  || — || June 21, 2007 || Mount Lemmon || Mount Lemmon Survey || — || align=right | 1.3 km || 
|-id=786 bgcolor=#fefefe
| 304786 ||  || — || June 23, 2007 || Siding Spring || SSS || — || align=right | 1.2 km || 
|-id=787 bgcolor=#fefefe
| 304787 ||  || — || July 11, 2007 || Reedy Creek || J. Broughton || — || align=right | 1.0 km || 
|-id=788 bgcolor=#fefefe
| 304788 Cresques ||  ||  || July 13, 2007 || La Sagra || OAM Obs. || — || align=right | 1.3 km || 
|-id=789 bgcolor=#fefefe
| 304789 ||  || — || July 12, 2007 || Reedy Creek || J. Broughton || FLO || align=right data-sort-value="0.88" | 880 m || 
|-id=790 bgcolor=#fefefe
| 304790 ||  || — || July 15, 2007 || Tiki || S. F. Hönig, N. Teamo || MAS || align=right data-sort-value="0.94" | 940 m || 
|-id=791 bgcolor=#fefefe
| 304791 ||  || — || July 15, 2007 || Siding Spring || SSS || — || align=right | 2.1 km || 
|-id=792 bgcolor=#fefefe
| 304792 ||  || — || July 16, 2007 || La Sagra || OAM Obs. || — || align=right | 1.2 km || 
|-id=793 bgcolor=#fefefe
| 304793 ||  || — || July 24, 2007 || Črni Vrh || Črni Vrh || — || align=right | 1.5 km || 
|-id=794 bgcolor=#fefefe
| 304794 ||  || — || August 7, 2007 || Reedy Creek || J. Broughton || NYS || align=right data-sort-value="0.87" | 870 m || 
|-id=795 bgcolor=#fefefe
| 304795 ||  || — || August 4, 2007 || Siding Spring || SSS || — || align=right data-sort-value="0.98" | 980 m || 
|-id=796 bgcolor=#fefefe
| 304796 ||  || — || August 9, 2007 || Tiki || S. F. Hönig, N. Teamo || NYS || align=right data-sort-value="0.93" | 930 m || 
|-id=797 bgcolor=#fefefe
| 304797 ||  || — || August 9, 2007 || Socorro || LINEAR || — || align=right data-sort-value="0.92" | 920 m || 
|-id=798 bgcolor=#fefefe
| 304798 ||  || — || August 6, 2007 || Reedy Creek || J. Broughton || — || align=right | 1.3 km || 
|-id=799 bgcolor=#fefefe
| 304799 ||  || — || August 9, 2007 || Socorro || LINEAR || EUT || align=right data-sort-value="0.89" | 890 m || 
|-id=800 bgcolor=#fefefe
| 304800 ||  || — || August 10, 2007 || Tiki || S. F. Hönig, N. Teamo || — || align=right | 1.0 km || 
|}

304801–304900 

|-bgcolor=#fefefe
| 304801 ||  || — || August 8, 2007 || Socorro || LINEAR || NYS || align=right data-sort-value="0.74" | 740 m || 
|-id=802 bgcolor=#fefefe
| 304802 ||  || — || August 8, 2007 || Socorro || LINEAR || — || align=right | 1.1 km || 
|-id=803 bgcolor=#fefefe
| 304803 ||  || — || August 8, 2007 || Socorro || LINEAR || NYS || align=right data-sort-value="0.83" | 830 m || 
|-id=804 bgcolor=#fefefe
| 304804 ||  || — || August 9, 2007 || Socorro || LINEAR || — || align=right | 1.1 km || 
|-id=805 bgcolor=#fefefe
| 304805 ||  || — || August 9, 2007 || Palomar || Palomar Obs. || — || align=right data-sort-value="0.94" | 940 m || 
|-id=806 bgcolor=#fefefe
| 304806 ||  || — || August 9, 2007 || Socorro || LINEAR || NYS || align=right data-sort-value="0.77" | 770 m || 
|-id=807 bgcolor=#fefefe
| 304807 ||  || — || August 10, 2007 || Kitt Peak || Spacewatch || — || align=right data-sort-value="0.92" | 920 m || 
|-id=808 bgcolor=#fefefe
| 304808 ||  || — || August 13, 2007 || Socorro || LINEAR || — || align=right | 1.0 km || 
|-id=809 bgcolor=#fefefe
| 304809 ||  || — || August 13, 2007 || Socorro || LINEAR || V || align=right | 1.0 km || 
|-id=810 bgcolor=#fefefe
| 304810 ||  || — || August 9, 2007 || Socorro || LINEAR || NYS || align=right data-sort-value="0.81" | 810 m || 
|-id=811 bgcolor=#E9E9E9
| 304811 ||  || — || August 10, 2007 || Kitt Peak || Spacewatch || — || align=right | 1.4 km || 
|-id=812 bgcolor=#fefefe
| 304812 ||  || — || August 9, 2007 || Kitt Peak || Spacewatch || — || align=right data-sort-value="0.77" | 770 m || 
|-id=813 bgcolor=#fefefe
| 304813 Cesarina ||  ||  || August 16, 2007 || San Marcello || M. Mazzucato, F. Dolfi || — || align=right data-sort-value="0.83" | 830 m || 
|-id=814 bgcolor=#fefefe
| 304814 ||  || — || August 18, 2007 || Purple Mountain || PMO NEO || — || align=right data-sort-value="0.90" | 900 m || 
|-id=815 bgcolor=#fefefe
| 304815 ||  || — || August 22, 2007 || Anderson Mesa || LONEOS || FLO || align=right data-sort-value="0.77" | 770 m || 
|-id=816 bgcolor=#fefefe
| 304816 ||  || — || August 22, 2007 || Socorro || LINEAR || MAS || align=right data-sort-value="0.82" | 820 m || 
|-id=817 bgcolor=#fefefe
| 304817 ||  || — || August 23, 2007 || Kitt Peak || Spacewatch || LCI || align=right | 1.1 km || 
|-id=818 bgcolor=#fefefe
| 304818 ||  || — || August 23, 2007 || Kitt Peak || Spacewatch || MAS || align=right data-sort-value="0.85" | 850 m || 
|-id=819 bgcolor=#fefefe
| 304819 ||  || — || August 23, 2007 || Kitt Peak || Spacewatch || — || align=right | 1.0 km || 
|-id=820 bgcolor=#fefefe
| 304820 ||  || — || August 23, 2007 || Kitt Peak || Spacewatch || — || align=right data-sort-value="0.99" | 990 m || 
|-id=821 bgcolor=#fefefe
| 304821 || 2007 RB || — || September 1, 2007 || Eskridge || G. Hug || NYS || align=right data-sort-value="0.73" | 730 m || 
|-id=822 bgcolor=#fefefe
| 304822 ||  || — || September 2, 2007 || Pla D'Arguines || R. Ferrando || FLO || align=right data-sort-value="0.95" | 950 m || 
|-id=823 bgcolor=#fefefe
| 304823 ||  || — || September 5, 2007 || Dauban || Chante-Perdrix Obs. || FLO || align=right | 1.4 km || 
|-id=824 bgcolor=#E9E9E9
| 304824 ||  || — || September 11, 2007 || Remanzacco || Remanzacco Obs. || — || align=right | 1.8 km || 
|-id=825 bgcolor=#fefefe
| 304825 ||  || — || September 13, 2007 || Bisei SG Center || BATTeRS || — || align=right | 1.0 km || 
|-id=826 bgcolor=#fefefe
| 304826 Kini ||  ||  || September 5, 2007 || Lulin Observatory || LUSS || MAS || align=right data-sort-value="0.81" | 810 m || 
|-id=827 bgcolor=#fefefe
| 304827 ||  || — || September 3, 2007 || Catalina || CSS || NYS || align=right data-sort-value="0.84" | 840 m || 
|-id=828 bgcolor=#fefefe
| 304828 ||  || — || September 3, 2007 || Catalina || CSS || — || align=right data-sort-value="0.97" | 970 m || 
|-id=829 bgcolor=#fefefe
| 304829 ||  || — || September 3, 2007 || Catalina || CSS || MAS || align=right data-sort-value="0.79" | 790 m || 
|-id=830 bgcolor=#fefefe
| 304830 ||  || — || September 3, 2007 || Catalina || CSS || NYS || align=right data-sort-value="0.67" | 670 m || 
|-id=831 bgcolor=#fefefe
| 304831 ||  || — || September 3, 2007 || Catalina || CSS || NYS || align=right data-sort-value="0.76" | 760 m || 
|-id=832 bgcolor=#fefefe
| 304832 ||  || — || September 3, 2007 || Catalina || CSS || — || align=right | 1.3 km || 
|-id=833 bgcolor=#fefefe
| 304833 ||  || — || September 3, 2007 || Catalina || CSS || — || align=right | 1.0 km || 
|-id=834 bgcolor=#fefefe
| 304834 ||  || — || September 4, 2007 || Mount Lemmon || Mount Lemmon Survey || MAS || align=right data-sort-value="0.74" | 740 m || 
|-id=835 bgcolor=#fefefe
| 304835 ||  || — || September 4, 2007 || Catalina || CSS || — || align=right | 1.2 km || 
|-id=836 bgcolor=#fefefe
| 304836 ||  || — || September 4, 2007 || Catalina || CSS || — || align=right | 2.0 km || 
|-id=837 bgcolor=#fefefe
| 304837 ||  || — || September 5, 2007 || Catalina || CSS || — || align=right | 1.6 km || 
|-id=838 bgcolor=#fefefe
| 304838 ||  || — || September 5, 2007 || Catalina || CSS || — || align=right | 1.3 km || 
|-id=839 bgcolor=#fefefe
| 304839 ||  || — || September 5, 2007 || Catalina || CSS || — || align=right | 1.1 km || 
|-id=840 bgcolor=#fefefe
| 304840 ||  || — || September 8, 2007 || Anderson Mesa || LONEOS || ERI || align=right | 2.2 km || 
|-id=841 bgcolor=#fefefe
| 304841 ||  || — || September 8, 2007 || Anderson Mesa || LONEOS || MAS || align=right data-sort-value="0.90" | 900 m || 
|-id=842 bgcolor=#E9E9E9
| 304842 ||  || — || September 8, 2007 || Catalina || CSS || GAL || align=right | 2.2 km || 
|-id=843 bgcolor=#fefefe
| 304843 ||  || — || September 9, 2007 || Kitt Peak || Spacewatch || NYS || align=right data-sort-value="0.72" | 720 m || 
|-id=844 bgcolor=#fefefe
| 304844 ||  || — || September 9, 2007 || Anderson Mesa || LONEOS || NYS || align=right data-sort-value="0.84" | 840 m || 
|-id=845 bgcolor=#fefefe
| 304845 ||  || — || September 9, 2007 || Anderson Mesa || LONEOS || V || align=right data-sort-value="0.85" | 850 m || 
|-id=846 bgcolor=#fefefe
| 304846 ||  || — || September 9, 2007 || Mount Lemmon || Mount Lemmon Survey || — || align=right data-sort-value="0.73" | 730 m || 
|-id=847 bgcolor=#fefefe
| 304847 ||  || — || September 9, 2007 || Kitt Peak || Spacewatch || — || align=right | 1.2 km || 
|-id=848 bgcolor=#fefefe
| 304848 ||  || — || September 9, 2007 || Kitt Peak || Spacewatch || FLO || align=right data-sort-value="0.78" | 780 m || 
|-id=849 bgcolor=#fefefe
| 304849 ||  || — || September 9, 2007 || Kitt Peak || Spacewatch || FLO || align=right data-sort-value="0.97" | 970 m || 
|-id=850 bgcolor=#fefefe
| 304850 ||  || — || September 9, 2007 || Kitt Peak || Spacewatch || — || align=right | 1.2 km || 
|-id=851 bgcolor=#fefefe
| 304851 ||  || — || September 10, 2007 || Kitt Peak || Spacewatch || V || align=right data-sort-value="0.64" | 640 m || 
|-id=852 bgcolor=#fefefe
| 304852 ||  || — || September 10, 2007 || Kitt Peak || Spacewatch || MAS || align=right data-sort-value="0.83" | 830 m || 
|-id=853 bgcolor=#fefefe
| 304853 ||  || — || September 10, 2007 || Kitt Peak || Spacewatch || NYS || align=right data-sort-value="0.86" | 860 m || 
|-id=854 bgcolor=#fefefe
| 304854 ||  || — || September 10, 2007 || Kitt Peak || Spacewatch || MAS || align=right data-sort-value="0.97" | 970 m || 
|-id=855 bgcolor=#fefefe
| 304855 ||  || — || September 10, 2007 || Kitt Peak || Spacewatch || NYS || align=right data-sort-value="0.76" | 760 m || 
|-id=856 bgcolor=#fefefe
| 304856 ||  || — || September 10, 2007 || Kitt Peak || Spacewatch || V || align=right data-sort-value="0.65" | 650 m || 
|-id=857 bgcolor=#fefefe
| 304857 ||  || — || September 10, 2007 || Mount Lemmon || Mount Lemmon Survey || NYS || align=right | 1.6 km || 
|-id=858 bgcolor=#fefefe
| 304858 ||  || — || September 10, 2007 || Mount Lemmon || Mount Lemmon Survey || CLA || align=right | 2.2 km || 
|-id=859 bgcolor=#E9E9E9
| 304859 ||  || — || September 10, 2007 || Mount Lemmon || Mount Lemmon Survey || MAR || align=right | 1.1 km || 
|-id=860 bgcolor=#E9E9E9
| 304860 ||  || — || September 10, 2007 || Kitt Peak || Spacewatch || — || align=right | 2.3 km || 
|-id=861 bgcolor=#fefefe
| 304861 ||  || — || September 10, 2007 || Kitt Peak || Spacewatch || — || align=right data-sort-value="0.85" | 850 m || 
|-id=862 bgcolor=#fefefe
| 304862 ||  || — || September 10, 2007 || Kitt Peak || Spacewatch || NYS || align=right data-sort-value="0.83" | 830 m || 
|-id=863 bgcolor=#fefefe
| 304863 ||  || — || September 10, 2007 || Kitt Peak || Spacewatch || MAS || align=right data-sort-value="0.95" | 950 m || 
|-id=864 bgcolor=#fefefe
| 304864 ||  || — || September 10, 2007 || Kitt Peak || Spacewatch || — || align=right | 1.2 km || 
|-id=865 bgcolor=#fefefe
| 304865 ||  || — || September 11, 2007 || Mount Lemmon || Mount Lemmon Survey || V || align=right data-sort-value="0.87" | 870 m || 
|-id=866 bgcolor=#fefefe
| 304866 ||  || — || September 11, 2007 || Kitt Peak || Spacewatch || — || align=right | 1.5 km || 
|-id=867 bgcolor=#fefefe
| 304867 ||  || — || September 11, 2007 || Kitt Peak || Spacewatch || — || align=right data-sort-value="0.94" | 940 m || 
|-id=868 bgcolor=#fefefe
| 304868 ||  || — || September 12, 2007 || Kitt Peak || Spacewatch || — || align=right data-sort-value="0.90" | 900 m || 
|-id=869 bgcolor=#fefefe
| 304869 ||  || — || September 12, 2007 || Kitt Peak || Spacewatch || NYS || align=right data-sort-value="0.96" | 960 m || 
|-id=870 bgcolor=#fefefe
| 304870 ||  || — || September 14, 2007 || Anderson Mesa || LONEOS || NYS || align=right data-sort-value="0.76" | 760 m || 
|-id=871 bgcolor=#fefefe
| 304871 ||  || — || September 13, 2007 || Socorro || LINEAR || NYS || align=right data-sort-value="0.90" | 900 m || 
|-id=872 bgcolor=#E9E9E9
| 304872 ||  || — || September 13, 2007 || Socorro || LINEAR || — || align=right | 1.4 km || 
|-id=873 bgcolor=#fefefe
| 304873 ||  || — || September 11, 2007 || Purple Mountain || PMO NEO || V || align=right data-sort-value="0.90" | 900 m || 
|-id=874 bgcolor=#fefefe
| 304874 ||  || — || September 12, 2007 || Catalina || CSS || — || align=right | 2.0 km || 
|-id=875 bgcolor=#fefefe
| 304875 ||  || — || September 12, 2007 || Anderson Mesa || LONEOS || V || align=right data-sort-value="0.74" | 740 m || 
|-id=876 bgcolor=#fefefe
| 304876 ||  || — || September 10, 2007 || Kitt Peak || Spacewatch || — || align=right data-sort-value="0.98" | 980 m || 
|-id=877 bgcolor=#fefefe
| 304877 ||  || — || September 5, 2007 || Catalina || CSS || FLO || align=right data-sort-value="0.81" | 810 m || 
|-id=878 bgcolor=#fefefe
| 304878 ||  || — || September 12, 2007 || Catalina || CSS || MAS || align=right | 1.0 km || 
|-id=879 bgcolor=#fefefe
| 304879 ||  || — || September 13, 2007 || Mount Lemmon || Mount Lemmon Survey || MAS || align=right data-sort-value="0.73" | 730 m || 
|-id=880 bgcolor=#fefefe
| 304880 ||  || — || September 10, 2007 || Kitt Peak || Spacewatch || — || align=right data-sort-value="0.76" | 760 m || 
|-id=881 bgcolor=#fefefe
| 304881 ||  || — || September 10, 2007 || Kitt Peak || Spacewatch || MAS || align=right data-sort-value="0.87" | 870 m || 
|-id=882 bgcolor=#fefefe
| 304882 ||  || — || September 10, 2007 || Kitt Peak || Spacewatch || NYS || align=right data-sort-value="0.64" | 640 m || 
|-id=883 bgcolor=#fefefe
| 304883 ||  || — || September 10, 2007 || Kitt Peak || Spacewatch || — || align=right | 1.1 km || 
|-id=884 bgcolor=#E9E9E9
| 304884 ||  || — || September 8, 2007 || Mount Lemmon || Mount Lemmon Survey || — || align=right | 1.5 km || 
|-id=885 bgcolor=#fefefe
| 304885 ||  || — || September 10, 2007 || Mount Lemmon || Mount Lemmon Survey || MAS || align=right data-sort-value="0.96" | 960 m || 
|-id=886 bgcolor=#E9E9E9
| 304886 ||  || — || September 10, 2007 || Mount Lemmon || Mount Lemmon Survey || — || align=right | 1.0 km || 
|-id=887 bgcolor=#fefefe
| 304887 ||  || — || September 12, 2007 || Catalina || CSS || V || align=right | 1.0 km || 
|-id=888 bgcolor=#E9E9E9
| 304888 ||  || — || September 10, 2007 || Kitt Peak || Spacewatch || — || align=right | 1.0 km || 
|-id=889 bgcolor=#fefefe
| 304889 ||  || — || September 12, 2007 || Kitt Peak || Spacewatch || NYS || align=right data-sort-value="0.81" | 810 m || 
|-id=890 bgcolor=#fefefe
| 304890 ||  || — || September 13, 2007 || Mount Lemmon || Mount Lemmon Survey || MAS || align=right data-sort-value="0.86" | 860 m || 
|-id=891 bgcolor=#E9E9E9
| 304891 ||  || — || September 13, 2007 || Catalina || CSS || — || align=right data-sort-value="0.93" | 930 m || 
|-id=892 bgcolor=#fefefe
| 304892 ||  || — || September 13, 2007 || Kitt Peak || Spacewatch || NYS || align=right data-sort-value="0.95" | 950 m || 
|-id=893 bgcolor=#E9E9E9
| 304893 ||  || — || September 13, 2007 || Kitt Peak || Spacewatch || — || align=right | 1.1 km || 
|-id=894 bgcolor=#fefefe
| 304894 ||  || — || September 10, 2007 || Kitt Peak || Spacewatch || LCI || align=right data-sort-value="0.97" | 970 m || 
|-id=895 bgcolor=#fefefe
| 304895 ||  || — || September 12, 2007 || Mount Lemmon || Mount Lemmon Survey || NYS || align=right data-sort-value="0.71" | 710 m || 
|-id=896 bgcolor=#E9E9E9
| 304896 ||  || — || September 8, 2007 || Mount Lemmon || Mount Lemmon Survey || JUN || align=right | 1.2 km || 
|-id=897 bgcolor=#fefefe
| 304897 ||  || — || September 10, 2007 || Kitt Peak || Spacewatch || — || align=right data-sort-value="0.67" | 670 m || 
|-id=898 bgcolor=#E9E9E9
| 304898 ||  || — || September 10, 2007 || Mount Lemmon || Mount Lemmon Survey || — || align=right | 1.8 km || 
|-id=899 bgcolor=#fefefe
| 304899 ||  || — || September 12, 2007 || Mount Lemmon || Mount Lemmon Survey || — || align=right | 1.0 km || 
|-id=900 bgcolor=#fefefe
| 304900 ||  || — || September 14, 2007 || Catalina || CSS || — || align=right | 1.5 km || 
|}

304901–305000 

|-bgcolor=#fefefe
| 304901 ||  || — || September 11, 2007 || Purple Mountain || PMO NEO || NYS || align=right data-sort-value="0.83" | 830 m || 
|-id=902 bgcolor=#fefefe
| 304902 ||  || — || September 11, 2007 || Kitt Peak || Spacewatch || V || align=right data-sort-value="0.89" | 890 m || 
|-id=903 bgcolor=#fefefe
| 304903 ||  || — || September 14, 2007 || Catalina || CSS || — || align=right | 1.1 km || 
|-id=904 bgcolor=#fefefe
| 304904 ||  || — || September 14, 2007 || Mount Lemmon || Mount Lemmon Survey || — || align=right data-sort-value="0.98" | 980 m || 
|-id=905 bgcolor=#fefefe
| 304905 ||  || — || September 15, 2007 || Mount Lemmon || Mount Lemmon Survey || — || align=right data-sort-value="0.86" | 860 m || 
|-id=906 bgcolor=#E9E9E9
| 304906 ||  || — || September 15, 2007 || Mount Lemmon || Mount Lemmon Survey || — || align=right | 1.3 km || 
|-id=907 bgcolor=#fefefe
| 304907 ||  || — || September 5, 2007 || Catalina || CSS || — || align=right | 2.2 km || 
|-id=908 bgcolor=#FA8072
| 304908 Steveoda ||  ||  || September 13, 2007 || Catalina || CSS || — || align=right | 1.2 km || 
|-id=909 bgcolor=#fefefe
| 304909 ||  || — || September 3, 2007 || Catalina || CSS || — || align=right data-sort-value="0.88" | 880 m || 
|-id=910 bgcolor=#fefefe
| 304910 ||  || — || September 5, 2007 || Catalina || CSS || V || align=right data-sort-value="0.93" | 930 m || 
|-id=911 bgcolor=#fefefe
| 304911 ||  || — || September 12, 2007 || Mount Lemmon || Mount Lemmon Survey || NYS || align=right data-sort-value="0.70" | 700 m || 
|-id=912 bgcolor=#fefefe
| 304912 ||  || — || September 10, 2007 || Kitt Peak || Spacewatch || — || align=right data-sort-value="0.96" | 960 m || 
|-id=913 bgcolor=#fefefe
| 304913 ||  || — || September 12, 2007 || Mount Lemmon || Mount Lemmon Survey || — || align=right | 1.1 km || 
|-id=914 bgcolor=#fefefe
| 304914 ||  || — || September 12, 2007 || Mount Lemmon || Mount Lemmon Survey || MAS || align=right data-sort-value="0.90" | 900 m || 
|-id=915 bgcolor=#E9E9E9
| 304915 ||  || — || September 14, 2007 || Mount Lemmon || Mount Lemmon Survey || — || align=right | 1.0 km || 
|-id=916 bgcolor=#fefefe
| 304916 ||  || — || September 14, 2007 || Mount Lemmon || Mount Lemmon Survey || NYS || align=right data-sort-value="0.62" | 620 m || 
|-id=917 bgcolor=#E9E9E9
| 304917 ||  || — || September 15, 2007 || Kitt Peak || Spacewatch || — || align=right data-sort-value="0.69" | 690 m || 
|-id=918 bgcolor=#E9E9E9
| 304918 ||  || — || September 14, 2007 || Mount Lemmon || Mount Lemmon Survey || — || align=right | 1.7 km || 
|-id=919 bgcolor=#E9E9E9
| 304919 ||  || — || September 14, 2007 || Mount Lemmon || Mount Lemmon Survey || — || align=right | 3.8 km || 
|-id=920 bgcolor=#fefefe
| 304920 ||  || — || September 13, 2007 || Mount Lemmon || Mount Lemmon Survey || NYS || align=right data-sort-value="0.76" | 760 m || 
|-id=921 bgcolor=#E9E9E9
| 304921 ||  || — || September 14, 2007 || Mount Lemmon || Mount Lemmon Survey || — || align=right | 1.5 km || 
|-id=922 bgcolor=#E9E9E9
| 304922 ||  || — || September 10, 2007 || Mount Lemmon || Mount Lemmon Survey || — || align=right | 2.5 km || 
|-id=923 bgcolor=#fefefe
| 304923 ||  || — || September 5, 2007 || Catalina || CSS || — || align=right data-sort-value="0.92" | 920 m || 
|-id=924 bgcolor=#fefefe
| 304924 ||  || — || September 12, 2007 || Catalina || CSS || V || align=right data-sort-value="0.75" | 750 m || 
|-id=925 bgcolor=#fefefe
| 304925 ||  || — || September 5, 2007 || Catalina || CSS || V || align=right data-sort-value="0.87" | 870 m || 
|-id=926 bgcolor=#fefefe
| 304926 ||  || — || September 5, 2007 || Catalina || CSS || — || align=right | 1.2 km || 
|-id=927 bgcolor=#fefefe
| 304927 ||  || — || September 13, 2007 || Kitt Peak || Spacewatch || — || align=right | 1.0 km || 
|-id=928 bgcolor=#E9E9E9
| 304928 ||  || — || September 13, 2007 || Mount Lemmon || Mount Lemmon Survey || — || align=right data-sort-value="0.98" | 980 m || 
|-id=929 bgcolor=#fefefe
| 304929 ||  || — || September 13, 2007 || Anderson Mesa || LONEOS || V || align=right data-sort-value="0.91" | 910 m || 
|-id=930 bgcolor=#fefefe
| 304930 ||  || — || September 12, 2007 || Catalina || CSS || — || align=right data-sort-value="0.85" | 850 m || 
|-id=931 bgcolor=#fefefe
| 304931 ||  || — || September 14, 2007 || Mount Lemmon || Mount Lemmon Survey || — || align=right data-sort-value="0.90" | 900 m || 
|-id=932 bgcolor=#E9E9E9
| 304932 ||  || — || September 14, 2007 || Kitt Peak || Spacewatch || — || align=right | 2.5 km || 
|-id=933 bgcolor=#E9E9E9
| 304933 ||  || — || September 15, 2007 || Mount Lemmon || Mount Lemmon Survey || — || align=right | 2.3 km || 
|-id=934 bgcolor=#E9E9E9
| 304934 ||  || — || September 15, 2007 || Mount Lemmon || Mount Lemmon Survey || GER || align=right | 1.7 km || 
|-id=935 bgcolor=#fefefe
| 304935 ||  || — || September 19, 2007 || Dauban || Chante-Perdrix Obs. || — || align=right data-sort-value="0.97" | 970 m || 
|-id=936 bgcolor=#FA8072
| 304936 ||  || — || September 19, 2007 || Altschwendt || W. Ries || — || align=right | 1.1 km || 
|-id=937 bgcolor=#E9E9E9
| 304937 ||  || — || September 26, 2007 || Mount Lemmon || Mount Lemmon Survey || — || align=right | 2.9 km || 
|-id=938 bgcolor=#fefefe
| 304938 ||  || — || September 30, 2007 || Kitt Peak || Spacewatch || NYS || align=right data-sort-value="0.71" | 710 m || 
|-id=939 bgcolor=#E9E9E9
| 304939 ||  || — || September 18, 2007 || Mount Lemmon || Mount Lemmon Survey || — || align=right | 1.2 km || 
|-id=940 bgcolor=#fefefe
| 304940 ||  || — || September 25, 2007 || Mount Lemmon || Mount Lemmon Survey || MAS || align=right data-sort-value="0.70" | 700 m || 
|-id=941 bgcolor=#fefefe
| 304941 ||  || — || October 6, 2007 || Pla D'Arguines || R. Ferrando || V || align=right data-sort-value="0.76" | 760 m || 
|-id=942 bgcolor=#E9E9E9
| 304942 ||  || — || October 6, 2007 || 7300 || W. K. Y. Yeung || HNS || align=right | 1.3 km || 
|-id=943 bgcolor=#fefefe
| 304943 ||  || — || October 6, 2007 || 7300 || W. K. Y. Yeung || V || align=right data-sort-value="0.87" | 870 m || 
|-id=944 bgcolor=#fefefe
| 304944 ||  || — || September 3, 2007 || Catalina || CSS || V || align=right data-sort-value="0.87" | 870 m || 
|-id=945 bgcolor=#d6d6d6
| 304945 ||  || — || October 7, 2007 || Catalina || CSS || EUP || align=right | 8.0 km || 
|-id=946 bgcolor=#fefefe
| 304946 ||  || — || October 6, 2007 || Socorro || LINEAR || MAS || align=right data-sort-value="0.84" | 840 m || 
|-id=947 bgcolor=#fefefe
| 304947 ||  || — || October 6, 2007 || Socorro || LINEAR || — || align=right | 1.3 km || 
|-id=948 bgcolor=#fefefe
| 304948 ||  || — || October 4, 2007 || Catalina || CSS || — || align=right | 1.1 km || 
|-id=949 bgcolor=#E9E9E9
| 304949 ||  || — || October 7, 2007 || Cordell-Lorenz || Cordell–Lorenz Obs. || — || align=right data-sort-value="0.98" | 980 m || 
|-id=950 bgcolor=#E9E9E9
| 304950 ||  || — || October 4, 2007 || Kitt Peak || Spacewatch || — || align=right | 1.9 km || 
|-id=951 bgcolor=#fefefe
| 304951 ||  || — || October 4, 2007 || Catalina || CSS || — || align=right | 1.0 km || 
|-id=952 bgcolor=#E9E9E9
| 304952 ||  || — || October 6, 2007 || Kitt Peak || Spacewatch || — || align=right | 1.1 km || 
|-id=953 bgcolor=#E9E9E9
| 304953 ||  || — || October 6, 2007 || Kitt Peak || Spacewatch || MAR || align=right | 1.3 km || 
|-id=954 bgcolor=#E9E9E9
| 304954 ||  || — || October 4, 2007 || Kitt Peak || Spacewatch || — || align=right | 1.1 km || 
|-id=955 bgcolor=#fefefe
| 304955 ||  || — || October 4, 2007 || Kitt Peak || Spacewatch || — || align=right | 1.0 km || 
|-id=956 bgcolor=#E9E9E9
| 304956 ||  || — || March 13, 2005 || Kitt Peak || Spacewatch || — || align=right | 1.2 km || 
|-id=957 bgcolor=#fefefe
| 304957 ||  || — || October 4, 2007 || Kitt Peak || Spacewatch || — || align=right data-sort-value="0.94" | 940 m || 
|-id=958 bgcolor=#E9E9E9
| 304958 ||  || — || October 7, 2007 || Mount Lemmon || Mount Lemmon Survey || — || align=right data-sort-value="0.87" | 870 m || 
|-id=959 bgcolor=#fefefe
| 304959 ||  || — || October 12, 2007 || 7300 || W. K. Y. Yeung || — || align=right | 1.5 km || 
|-id=960 bgcolor=#fefefe
| 304960 ||  || — || October 5, 2007 || Kitt Peak || Spacewatch || FLO || align=right | 1.0 km || 
|-id=961 bgcolor=#fefefe
| 304961 ||  || — || October 8, 2007 || Mount Lemmon || Mount Lemmon Survey || — || align=right data-sort-value="0.82" | 820 m || 
|-id=962 bgcolor=#fefefe
| 304962 ||  || — || October 6, 2007 || Kitt Peak || Spacewatch || — || align=right data-sort-value="0.94" | 940 m || 
|-id=963 bgcolor=#fefefe
| 304963 ||  || — || October 7, 2007 || Catalina || CSS || — || align=right | 1.0 km || 
|-id=964 bgcolor=#fefefe
| 304964 ||  || — || October 8, 2007 || Mount Lemmon || Mount Lemmon Survey || NYS || align=right data-sort-value="0.81" | 810 m || 
|-id=965 bgcolor=#E9E9E9
| 304965 ||  || — || October 6, 2007 || Kitt Peak || Spacewatch || — || align=right | 1.2 km || 
|-id=966 bgcolor=#fefefe
| 304966 ||  || — || October 6, 2007 || Kitt Peak || Spacewatch || V || align=right data-sort-value="0.82" | 820 m || 
|-id=967 bgcolor=#E9E9E9
| 304967 ||  || — || October 6, 2007 || Kitt Peak || Spacewatch || HNS || align=right | 1.6 km || 
|-id=968 bgcolor=#fefefe
| 304968 ||  || — || October 7, 2007 || Mount Lemmon || Mount Lemmon Survey || — || align=right data-sort-value="0.99" | 990 m || 
|-id=969 bgcolor=#E9E9E9
| 304969 ||  || — || October 7, 2007 || Mount Lemmon || Mount Lemmon Survey || HEN || align=right | 1.0 km || 
|-id=970 bgcolor=#fefefe
| 304970 ||  || — || October 9, 2007 || Socorro || LINEAR || V || align=right data-sort-value="0.88" | 880 m || 
|-id=971 bgcolor=#fefefe
| 304971 ||  || — || October 9, 2007 || Socorro || LINEAR || — || align=right | 1.1 km || 
|-id=972 bgcolor=#fefefe
| 304972 ||  || — || October 9, 2007 || Socorro || LINEAR || — || align=right | 1.3 km || 
|-id=973 bgcolor=#E9E9E9
| 304973 ||  || — || October 9, 2007 || Socorro || LINEAR || — || align=right | 1.7 km || 
|-id=974 bgcolor=#fefefe
| 304974 ||  || — || October 11, 2007 || Socorro || LINEAR || V || align=right data-sort-value="0.81" | 810 m || 
|-id=975 bgcolor=#E9E9E9
| 304975 ||  || — || October 11, 2007 || Socorro || LINEAR || — || align=right | 1.6 km || 
|-id=976 bgcolor=#E9E9E9
| 304976 ||  || — || October 12, 2007 || Dauban || Chante-Perdrix Obs. || — || align=right | 1.5 km || 
|-id=977 bgcolor=#E9E9E9
| 304977 ||  || — || October 6, 2007 || Kitt Peak || Spacewatch || — || align=right | 2.0 km || 
|-id=978 bgcolor=#E9E9E9
| 304978 ||  || — || October 7, 2007 || Catalina || CSS || JUL || align=right | 1.7 km || 
|-id=979 bgcolor=#E9E9E9
| 304979 ||  || — || October 13, 2007 || Socorro || LINEAR || — || align=right | 1.7 km || 
|-id=980 bgcolor=#fefefe
| 304980 ||  || — || October 8, 2007 || Mount Lemmon || Mount Lemmon Survey || — || align=right | 1.2 km || 
|-id=981 bgcolor=#E9E9E9
| 304981 ||  || — || October 7, 2007 || Catalina || CSS || — || align=right data-sort-value="0.97" | 970 m || 
|-id=982 bgcolor=#E9E9E9
| 304982 ||  || — || October 7, 2007 || Kitt Peak || Spacewatch || — || align=right | 1.1 km || 
|-id=983 bgcolor=#fefefe
| 304983 ||  || — || October 7, 2007 || Kitt Peak || Spacewatch || NYS || align=right data-sort-value="0.96" | 960 m || 
|-id=984 bgcolor=#E9E9E9
| 304984 ||  || — || October 7, 2007 || Kitt Peak || Spacewatch || — || align=right | 1.7 km || 
|-id=985 bgcolor=#E9E9E9
| 304985 ||  || — || October 7, 2007 || Kitt Peak || Spacewatch || — || align=right | 1.0 km || 
|-id=986 bgcolor=#E9E9E9
| 304986 ||  || — || October 7, 2007 || Kitt Peak || Spacewatch || — || align=right | 1.7 km || 
|-id=987 bgcolor=#E9E9E9
| 304987 ||  || — || October 8, 2007 || Kitt Peak || Spacewatch || — || align=right | 1.5 km || 
|-id=988 bgcolor=#E9E9E9
| 304988 ||  || — || October 8, 2007 || Kitt Peak || Spacewatch || — || align=right | 1.7 km || 
|-id=989 bgcolor=#E9E9E9
| 304989 ||  || — || October 8, 2007 || Kitt Peak || Spacewatch || — || align=right | 1.3 km || 
|-id=990 bgcolor=#E9E9E9
| 304990 ||  || — || October 8, 2007 || Kitt Peak || Spacewatch || — || align=right data-sort-value="0.96" | 960 m || 
|-id=991 bgcolor=#E9E9E9
| 304991 ||  || — || October 10, 2007 || Kitt Peak || Spacewatch || HNS || align=right | 1.2 km || 
|-id=992 bgcolor=#fefefe
| 304992 ||  || — || October 6, 2007 || Kitt Peak || Spacewatch || — || align=right data-sort-value="0.92" | 920 m || 
|-id=993 bgcolor=#E9E9E9
| 304993 ||  || — || October 8, 2007 || Catalina || CSS || — || align=right | 1.3 km || 
|-id=994 bgcolor=#fefefe
| 304994 ||  || — || October 11, 2007 || Kitt Peak || Spacewatch || — || align=right | 1.1 km || 
|-id=995 bgcolor=#fefefe
| 304995 ||  || — || October 11, 2007 || Catalina || CSS || — || align=right data-sort-value="0.94" | 940 m || 
|-id=996 bgcolor=#fefefe
| 304996 ||  || — || October 8, 2007 || Mount Lemmon || Mount Lemmon Survey || — || align=right | 1.6 km || 
|-id=997 bgcolor=#E9E9E9
| 304997 ||  || — || October 10, 2007 || Mount Lemmon || Mount Lemmon Survey || — || align=right | 1.6 km || 
|-id=998 bgcolor=#E9E9E9
| 304998 ||  || — || October 10, 2007 || Kitt Peak || Spacewatch || — || align=right | 1.6 km || 
|-id=999 bgcolor=#fefefe
| 304999 ||  || — || October 10, 2007 || Kitt Peak || Spacewatch || — || align=right | 1.2 km || 
|-id=000 bgcolor=#fefefe
| 305000 ||  || — || October 10, 2007 || Kitt Peak || Spacewatch || NYS || align=right | 1.2 km || 
|}

References

External links 
 Discovery Circumstances: Numbered Minor Planets (300001)–(305000) (IAU Minor Planet Center)

0304